= Hermitage Museum =

Museum in Saint Petersburg, Russia

The State Hermitage Museum

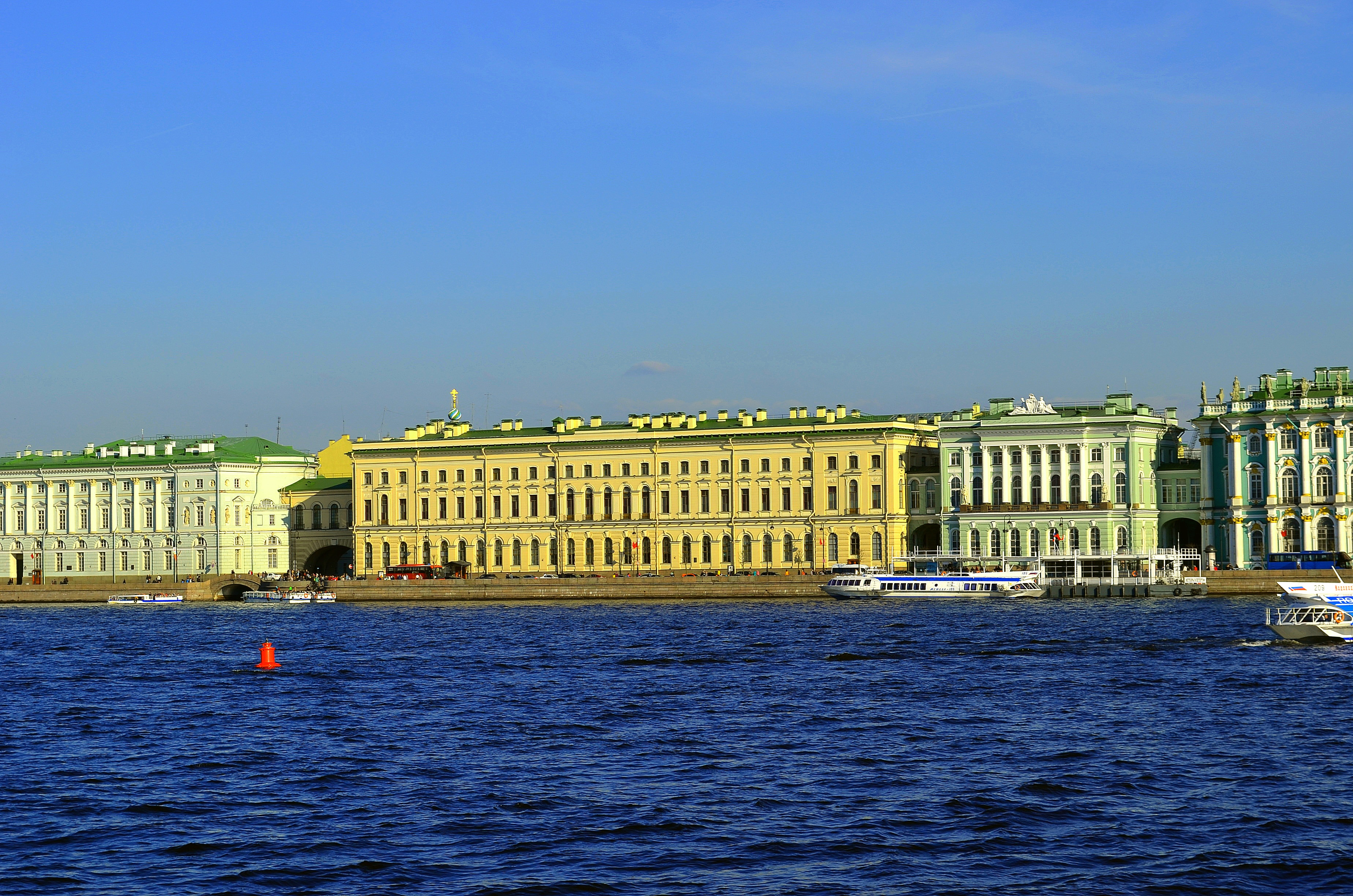
- View of (from left) the Hermitage Theatre, Old Hermitage, and Small Hermitage
- Interactive fullscreen map
- Established: 1764; 262 years ago
- Location: 34 Palace Embankment, Dvortsovy Municipal Okrug, Central District, Saint Petersburg, Russia
- Coordinates: 59°56′26″N 30°18′49″E
- Collection size: 3 million
- Visitors: 2,812,913 visitors (2022)
- Director: Mikhail Piotrovsky
- Public transit access: Admiralteyskaya station
- Website: hermitagemuseum.org

The State Hermitage Museum (Russian: Государственный Эрмитаж, romanized: Gosudarstvennyj Ermitaž, IPA: [ɡəsʊˈdarstvʲɪn(ː)ɨj ɪrmʲɪˈtaʂ]) is a museum of art and culture in Saint Petersburg, Russia, and holds the largest collection of paintings in the world. It was founded in 1764 when Empress Catherine the Great acquired a collection of paintings from the Berlin merchant Johann Ernst Gotzkowsky. The museum celebrates the anniversary of its founding each year on 7 December, Saint Catherine's Day. It has been open to the public since 1852. The Art Newspaper ranked the museum 10th in their list of the most visited art museums, with 2,812,913 visitors in 2022.

Its collections, of which only a small part is on permanent display, comprises over three million items (the numismatic collection accounting for about one-third of them). The collections occupy a large complex of six historic buildings along Palace Embankment, including the Winter Palace, a former residence of Russian emperors. Apart from them, the Menshikov Palace, Museum of Porcelain, Storage Facility at Staraya Derevnya, and the eastern wing of the General Staff Building are also part of the museum. The museum has several exhibition centres abroad. The Hermitage is a federal state property. Since July 1992, the director of the museum has been Mikhail Piotrovsky.

Of the six buildings in the main museum complex, five—namely the Winter Palace, Small Hermitage, Old Hermitage, New Hermitage, and Hermitage Theatre—are all open to the public. The entrance ticket for foreign tourists costs more than the fee paid by citizens of Russia and Belarus. However, entrance is free of charge the third Thursday of every month for all visitors, and free daily for students and children. The museum is closed on Mondays. The entrance for individual visitors is located in the Winter Palace, accessible from the Courtyard.

== Name ==
A hermitage is the dwelling of a hermit or recluse, who lives in isolation from society. Originally, the "Hermitage" of the Winter Palace referred to the Palace's private apartments—so-named because, as the personal residence of the Tsars, they were intended to be a refuge from the obligations of courtly life; where the Russian sovereigns could retreat to with their intimate circle of personal friends. As such, what is today the Hermitage Museum was initially the personal collection of the Russian Imperial family.

The Hermitage of the Winter Palace was founded by Catherine the Great, who used these apartments to host private salons. She also founded the Museum's collection in 1764, with a collection of 225 paintings from Western Europe.

Today, the Hermitage Museum includes a complex of six buildings, and has extended beyond the original palace apartments (today called the "Small Hermitage").

== Buildings ==
Originally, the only building housing the collection was the "Small Hermitage". Today, the Hermitage Museum encompasses many buildings on the Palace Embankment and its neighbourhoods. Apart from the Small Hermitage, the museum now also includes the "Old Hermitage" (also called "Large Hermitage"), the "New Hermitage", the "Hermitage Theatre", and the "Winter Palace", the former main residence of the Russian tsars. In recent years, the Hermitage has expanded to the General Staff Building on the Palace Square facing the Winter Palace, and the Menshikov Palace.

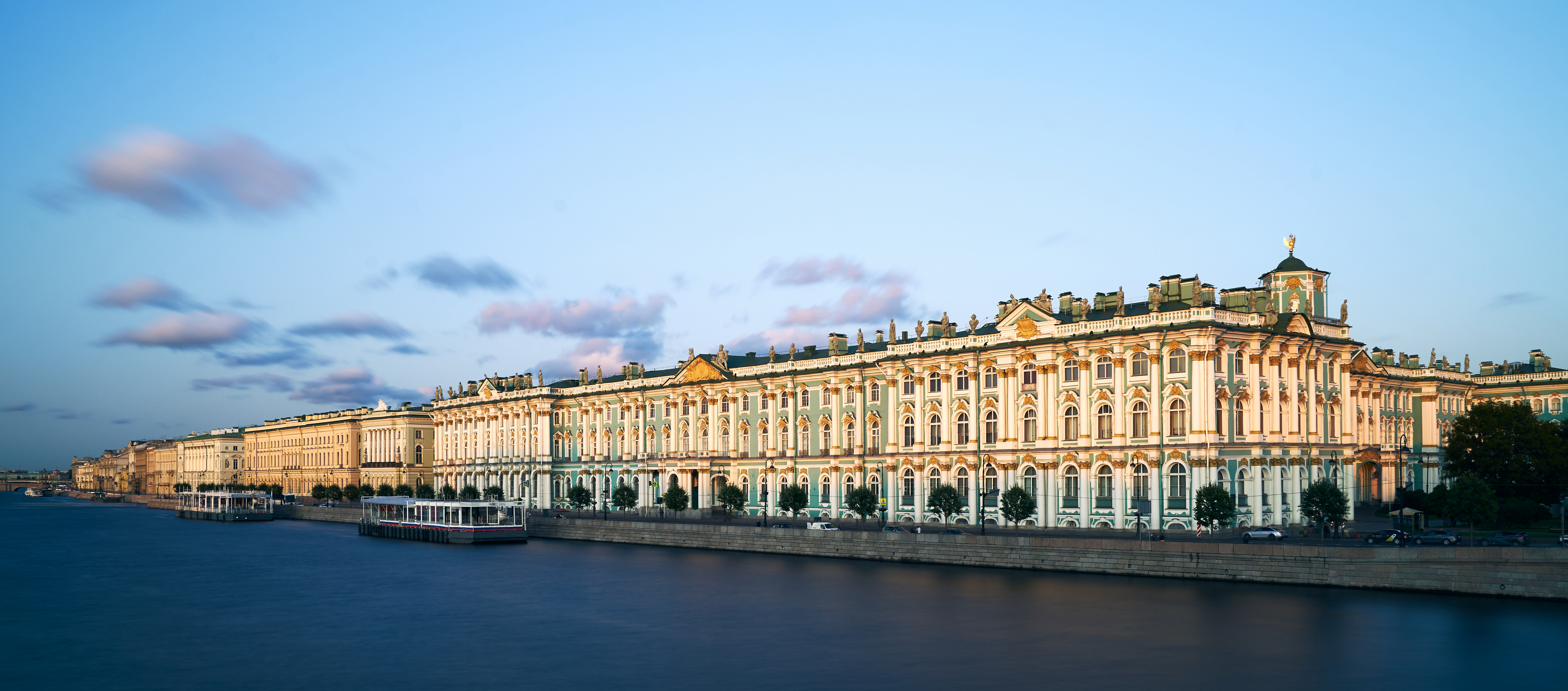
The Hermitage Museum complex. From left to right: Hermitage Theatre – Old Hermitage – Small Hermitage – Winter Palace (the "New Hermitage" is situated behind the Old Hermitage)

== Collections ==
The Western European Art collection includes European paintings, sculpture, and applied art from the 13th to the 20th centuries.

=== Egyptian antiquities ===
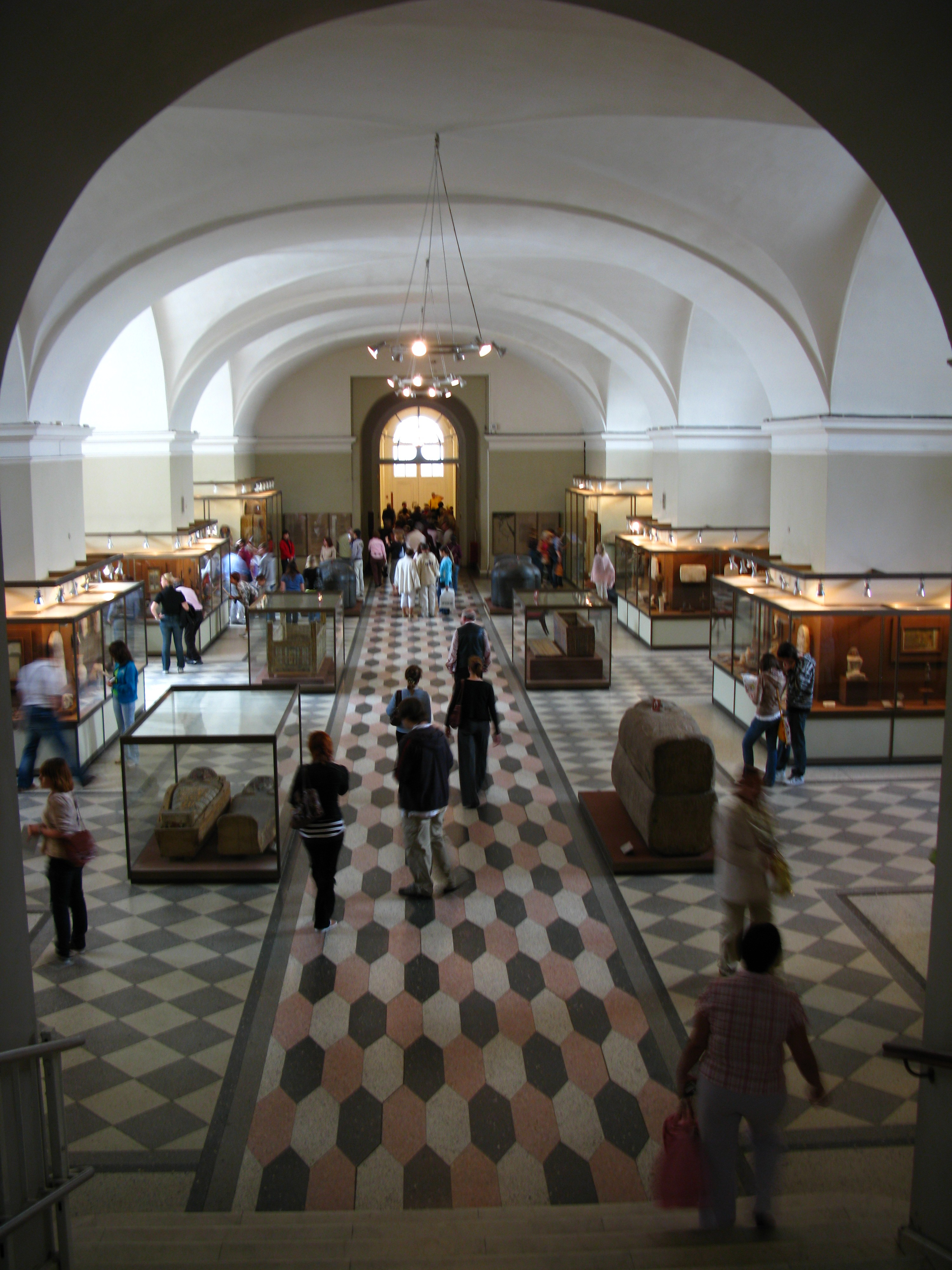
Egyptian Hall

Since 1940, the Egyptian collection, dating back to 1852 and including the former Castiglione Collection, has occupied a large hall on the ground floor in the eastern part of the Winter Palace.

=== Classical antiquities ===
The collection of classical antiquities occupies most of the ground floor of the Old and New Hermitage buildings. The interiors of the ground floor were designed by the German architect Leo von Klenze in the Greek Revival style in the early 1850s, using painted polished stucco and columns of natural marble and granite.

The Room of the Great Vase in the western wing features the 2.57 m (8.4 ft) high Kolyvan Vase, weighing 19 t (42,000 lb), made of jasper in 1843 and installed before the walls were erected. While the western wing was designed for exhibitions, the rooms on the ground floor in the eastern wing of the New Hermitage, now also hosting exhibitions, were originally intended for libraries.

The collection of classical antiquities features Greek artefacts from the third millennium – fifth century BC, ancient Greek pottery, items from the Greek cities of the North Pontic Greek colonies, Hellenistic sculpture and jewellery, including engraved gems and cameos, such as the famous Gonzaga Cameo, Italic art from the 9th to second century BC, Roman marble and bronze sculpture and applied art from the first century BC to fourth century AD, including copies of Classical and Hellenistic Greek sculptures. One of the highlights of the collection is the Tauride Venus, which, according to latest research, is an original Hellenistic Greek sculpture rather than a Roman copy as it was thought before. There are, however, only a few pieces of authentic Classical Greek sculpture and sepulchral monuments.

=== Prehistoric art ===
On the ground floor in the western wing of the Winter Palace the collections of prehistoric artefacts and the culture and art of the Caucasus are located, as well as the second treasure gallery. The prehistoric artefacts date from the Paleolithic to the Iron Age and were excavated all over Russia and other parts of the former Soviet Union and Russian Empire. Among them is a renowned collection of the art and culture of nomadic tribes of the Altai from Pazyryk and Bashadar sites, including the world's oldest surviving knotted-pile carpet and a well-preserved wooden chariot, both from the 4th–3rd centuries BC. The Caucasian exhibition includes a collection of Urartu artefacts from Armenia and Western Armenia. Many of them were excavated at Teishebaini under the supervision of Boris Piotrovsky, former director of the Hermitage Museum.

=== Jewellery and decorative art ===
Four small rooms on the ground floor, enclosed in the middle of the New Hermitage between the room displaying Classical Antiquities, comprise the first treasure gallery, featuring western jewellery from the 4th millennium BC to the early 20th century AD. The second treasure gallery, located on the ground floor in the southwest corner of the Winter Palace, features jewellery from the Pontic steppes, Caucasus and Asia, in particular Scythian and Sarmatian gold.

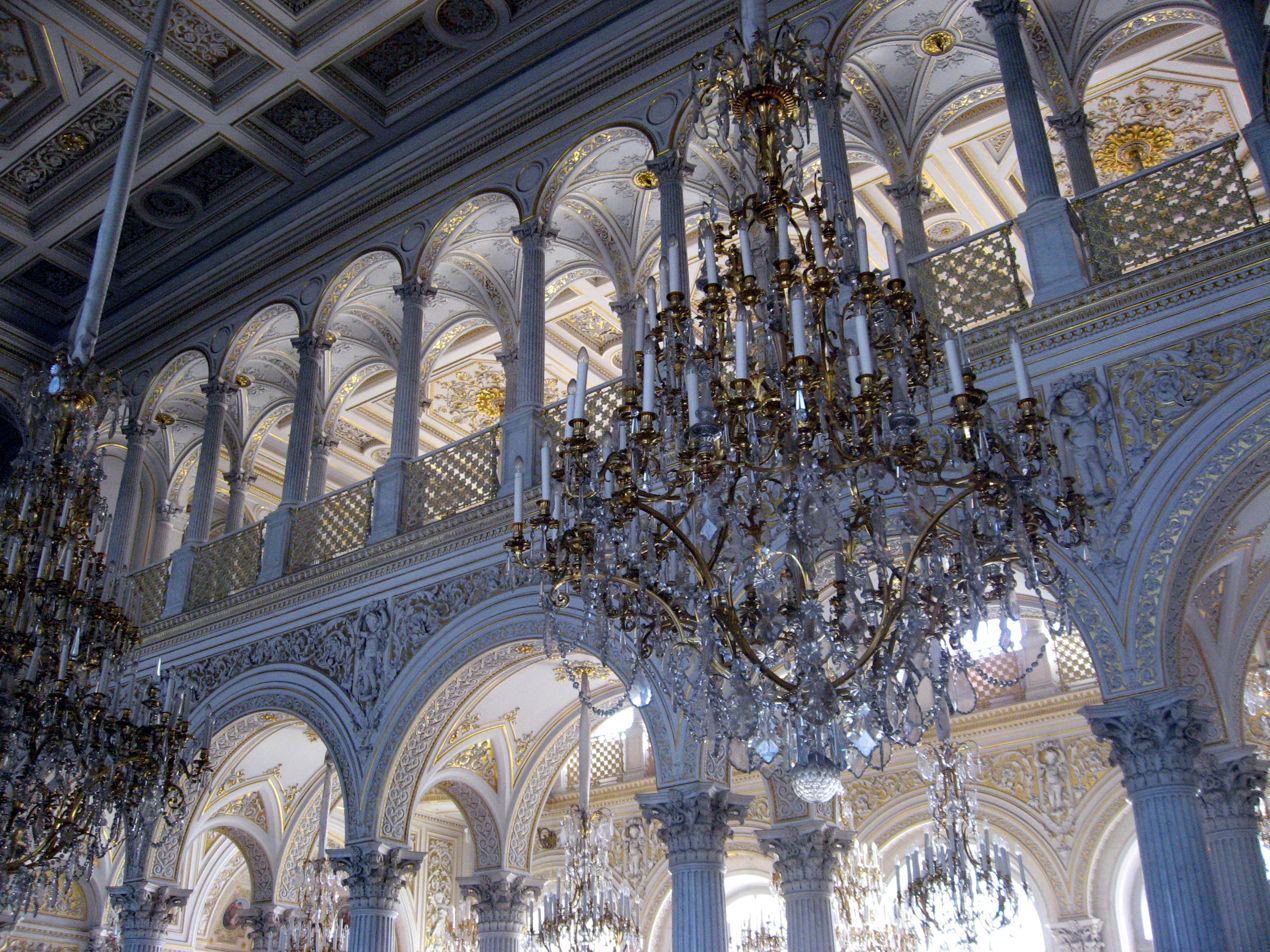
The Pavilion Hall

Pavilion Hall, designed by Andrei Stackenschneider in 1858, occupies the first floor of the Northern Pavilion in the Small Hermitage. It features the 18th-century golden Peacock Clock by James Cox and a collection of mosaics. Two galleries spanning the west side of the Small Hermitage from the Northern to Southern Pavilion house an exhibition of Western European decorative and applied art from the 12th to 15th century and the fine art of the Low Countries from the 15th and 16th centuries.

=== Italian Renaissance ===
The rooms on the first floor of the Old Hermitage were designed by Andrei Stackenschneider in revival styles in between 1851 and 1860, although the design survives only in some of them. They feature works of Italian Renaissance artists, including Giorgione, Titian, Veronese, as well as Benois Madonna and Madonna Litta attributed to Leonardo da Vinci or his school.

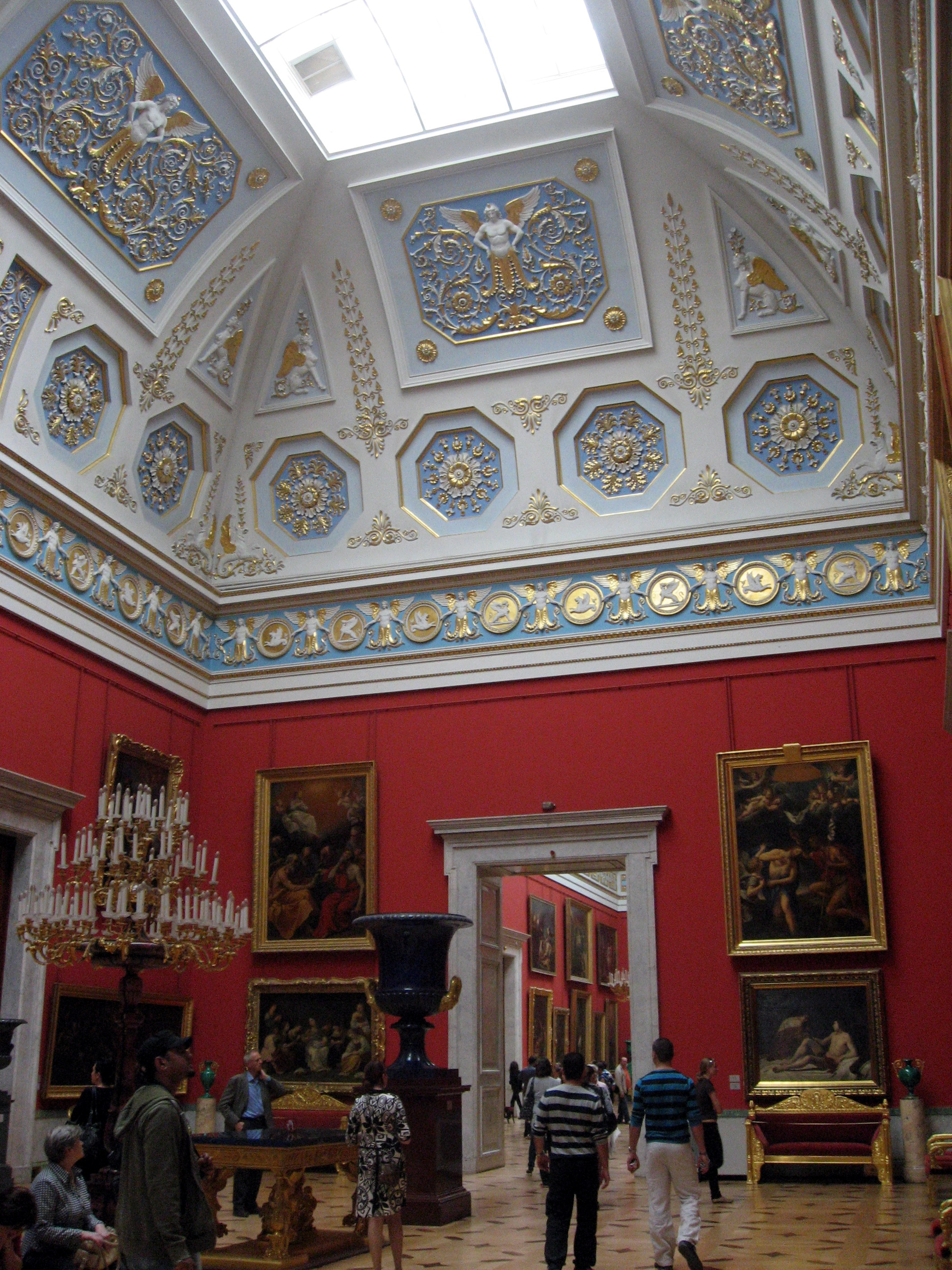
The Small Italian Skylight Room

The Italian Renaissance galleries continues in the eastern wing of the New Hermitage with paintings, sculpture, majolica and tapestry from Italy of the 15th–16th centuries, including Conestabile Madonna and Madonna with Beardless St. Joseph by Raphael.

=== Italian and Spanish fine art ===
The first floor of New Hermitage contains three large interior spaces in the centre of the museum complex with red walls and lit from above by skylights. These are adorned with 19th-century Russian lapidary works and feature Italian and Spanish canvases of the 16th–18th centuries, including Veronese, Giambattista Pittoni, Tintoretto, Velázquez and Murillo.

=== Knights' Hall ===
The Knights' Hall, a large room in the eastern part of the New Hermitage originally designed in the Greek revival style for the display of coins, now hosts a collection of Western European arms and armour from the 15th–17th centuries, part of the Hermitage Arsenal collection.

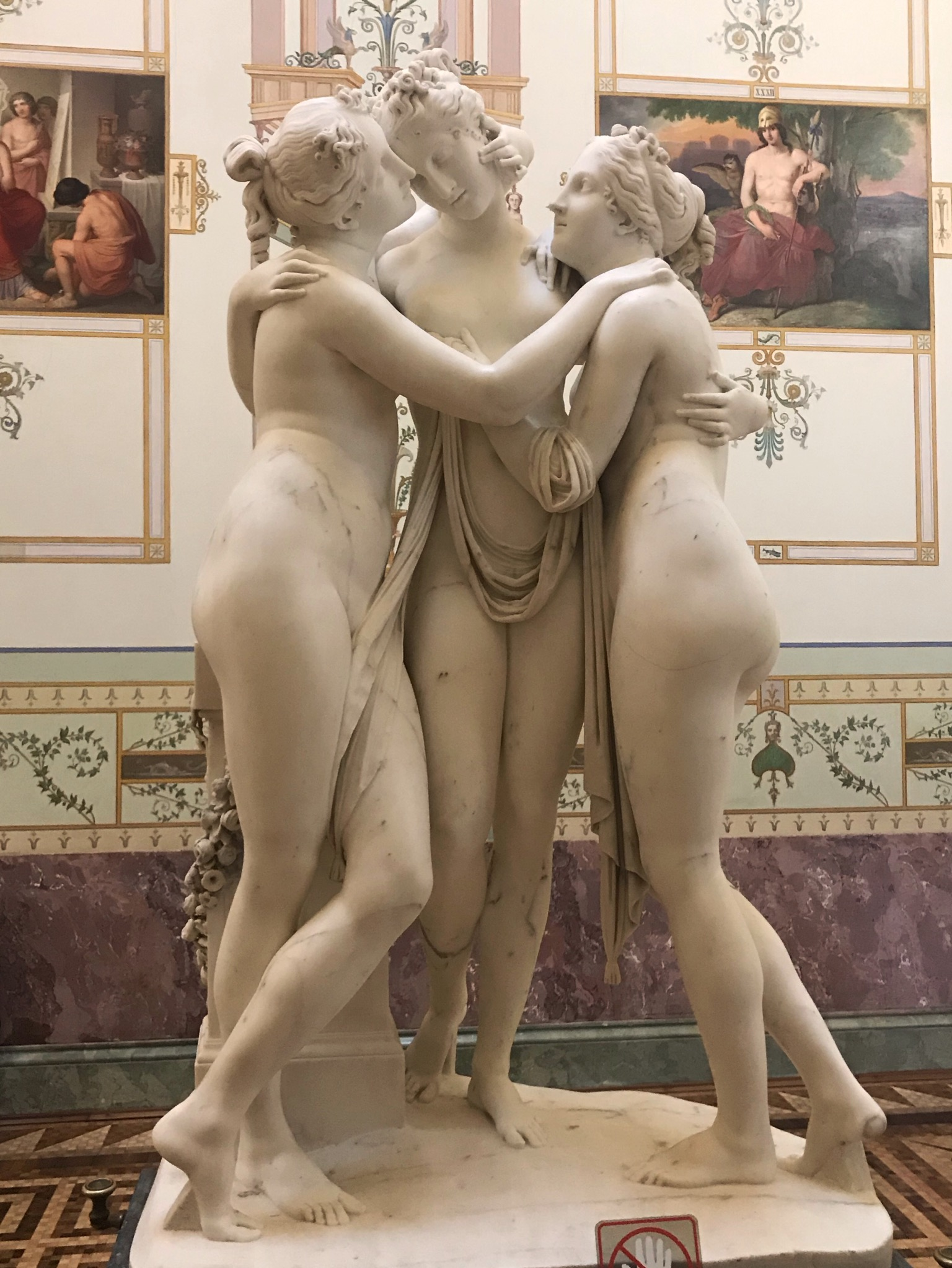
The Three Graces, 1813–1816, by Canova

The Gallery of the History of Ancient Painting adjoins the Knights' Hall and also flanks the skylight rooms. It was designed by Leo von Klenze in the Greek revival style as a prelude to the museum and features neoclassical marble sculptures by Antonio Canova and his followers. In the middle, the gallery opens to the main staircase of the New Hermitage, which served as the entrance to the museum before the October Revolution of 1917, but is now closed.

=== Dutch Golden Age and Flemish Baroque ===
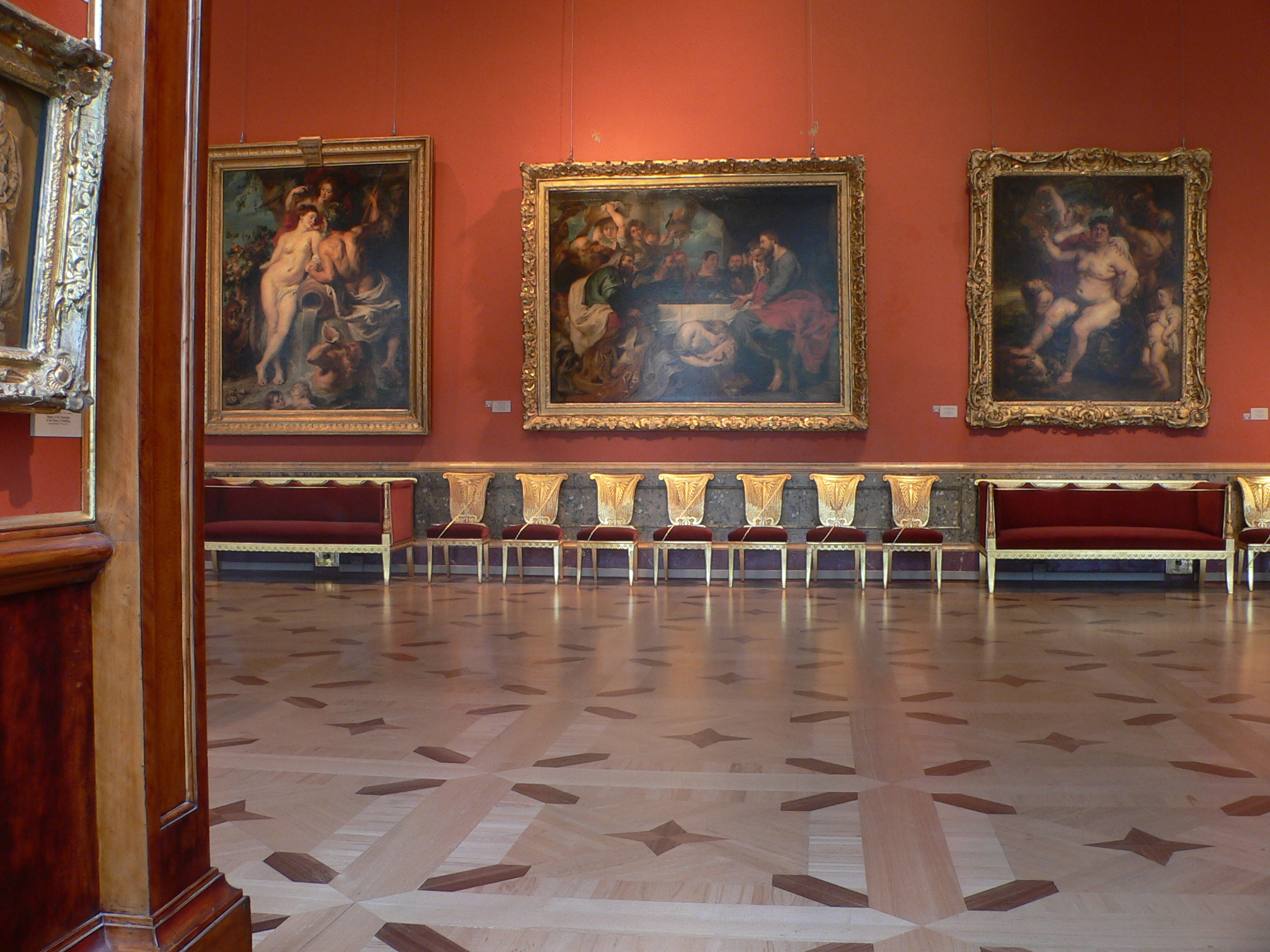
The Rubens Room

The rooms and galleries along the southern facade and in the western wing of the New Hermitage are now entirely devoted to Dutch Golden Age and Flemish Baroque painting of the 17th century, including the large collections of Van Dyck, Rubens and Rembrandt.

=== German, Swiss, British and French fine art ===
The first floor rooms on the southern facade of the Winter Palace are occupied by the collections of German fine art of the 16th century and French fine art of the 15th–18th centuries, including paintings by Poussin, Lorrain, Watteau. The collections of French decorative and applied art from the 17th–18th centuries and British applied and fine art from the 16th–19th century, including Thomas Gainsborough and Joshua Reynolds, are on display in nearby rooms facing the courtyard.

=== Russian art ===
The richly decorated interiors of the first floor of the Winter Palace on its eastern, northern and western sides are part of the Russian culture collection and host the exhibitions of Russian art from the 11th-19th centuries.

=== French Neoclassical, Impressionist, and post-Impressionist art ===
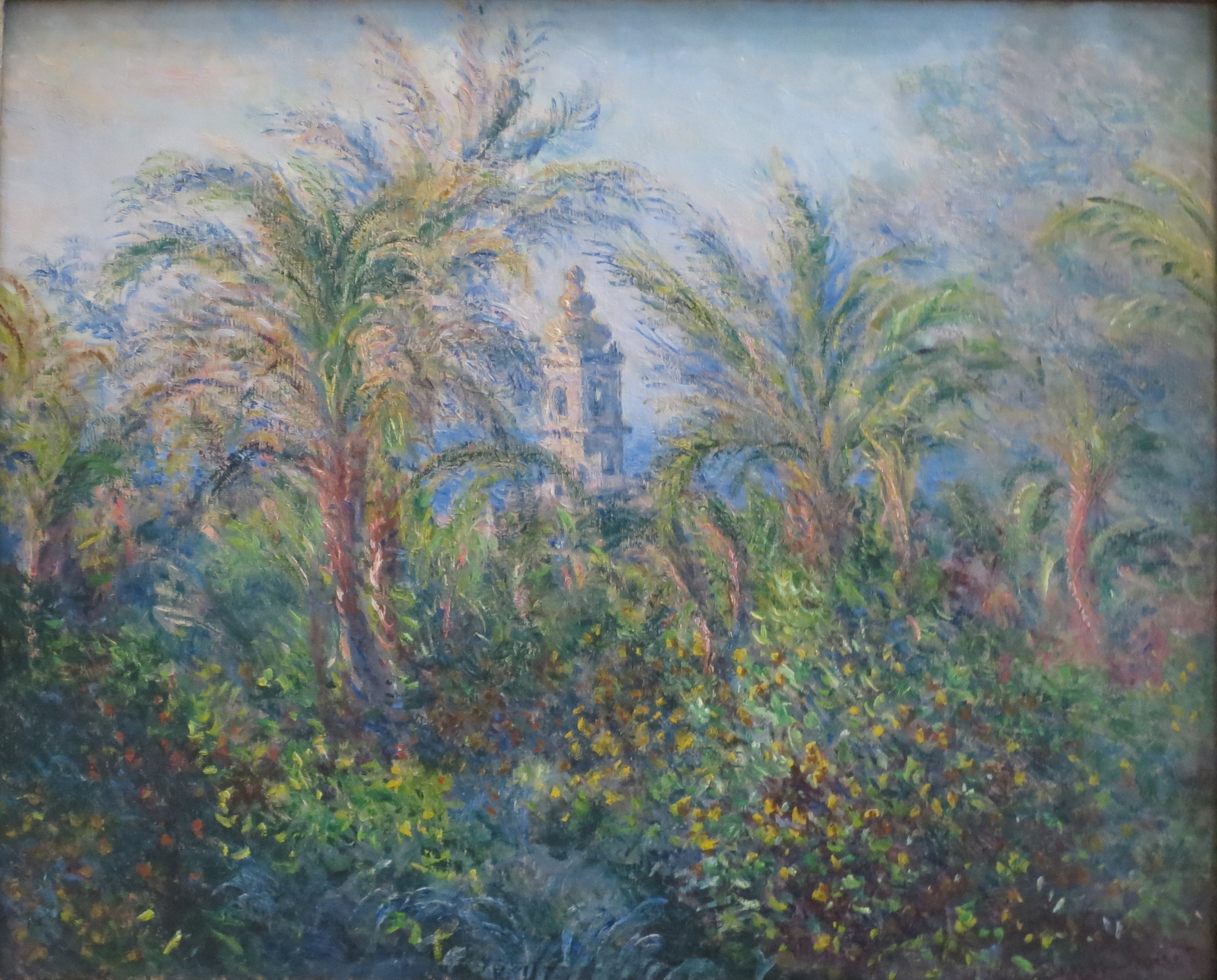
Garden at Bordighera, Impression of Morning, 1884, by Claude Monet

French Neoclassical, Impressionist and post-Impressionist art, including works by Renoir, Monet, Van Gogh and Gauguin, are displayed on the fourth floor of the Eastern Wing of the General Staff Building. Also displayed are paintings by Camille Pissarro (Boulevard Montmartre, Paris), Paul Cézanne (Mount Sainte-Victoire), Alfred Sisley, Henri Morel, and Degas.

=== Modern, German Romantic and other 19th–20th century art ===
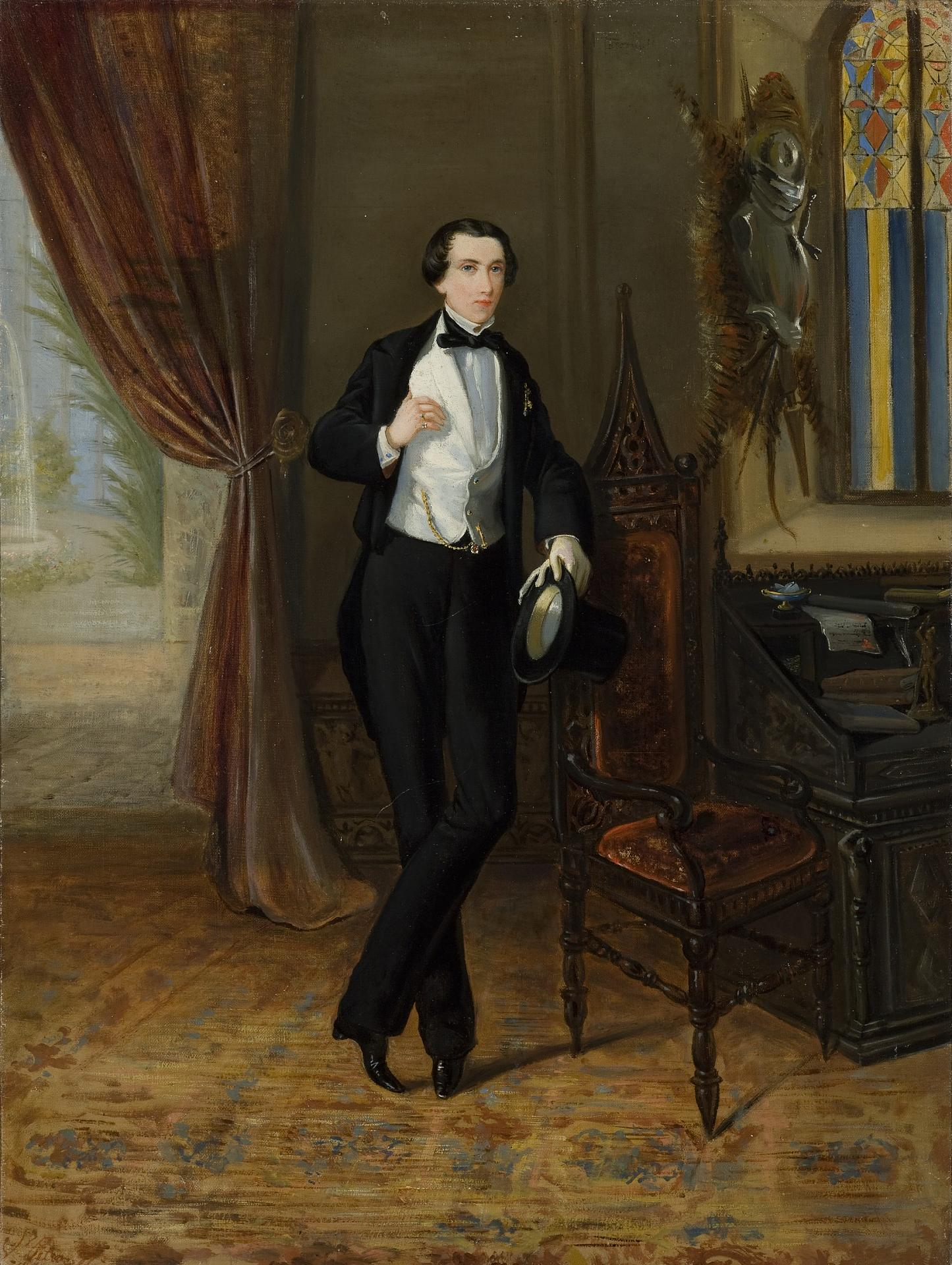
Portrait of Nikolay Borisovich Yusupov by Italian Vincenzo Petrocelli, 1851

Modern art is displayed in the General Staff Building (Saint Petersburg). It features Matisse, Derain and other fauvists, Picasso, Malevich, Petrocelli, Kandinsky, Giacomo Manzù, Giorgio Morandi and Rockwell Kent. A large room is devoted to the German Romantic art of the 19th century, including several paintings by Caspar David Friedrich. The second floor of the Western wing features collections of the Oriental art (from China, India, Mongolia, Tibet, Central Asia, Byzantium and Near East).

== History ==
=== Origins: Catherine's collection ===
Catherine the Great started her art collection in 1764 by purchasing paintings from Berlin merchant Johann Ernst Gotzkowsky. He assembled the collection for Frederick II of Prussia, who ultimately refused to purchase it after losing the Seven Years' War. Thus, Gotzkowsky provided 225 or 317 paintings (conflicting accounts list both numbers), mainly Flemish and Dutch, as well as others, including 90 not precisely identified, to the Russian crown. The collection consisted of Rembrandt (13 paintings), Rubens (11 paintings), Jacob Jordaens (7 paintings), Anthony van Dyck (5 paintings), Paolo Veronese (5 paintings), Frans Hals (3 paintings, including Portrait of a Young Man with a Glove), Raphael (2 paintings), Holbein (2 paintings), Titian (1 painting), Jan Steen (The Idlers), Hendrik Goltzius, Dirck van Baburen, Hendrick van Balen and Gerrit van Honthorst. Perhaps some of the most famous and notable artworks that were a part of Catherine's original purchase from Gotzkowsky were Danaë, painted by Rembrandt in 1636; Descent from the Cross, painted by Rembrandt in 1624; and Portrait of a Young Man Holding a Glove, painted by Frans Hals in 1650. These paintings remain in the Hermitage collection today.

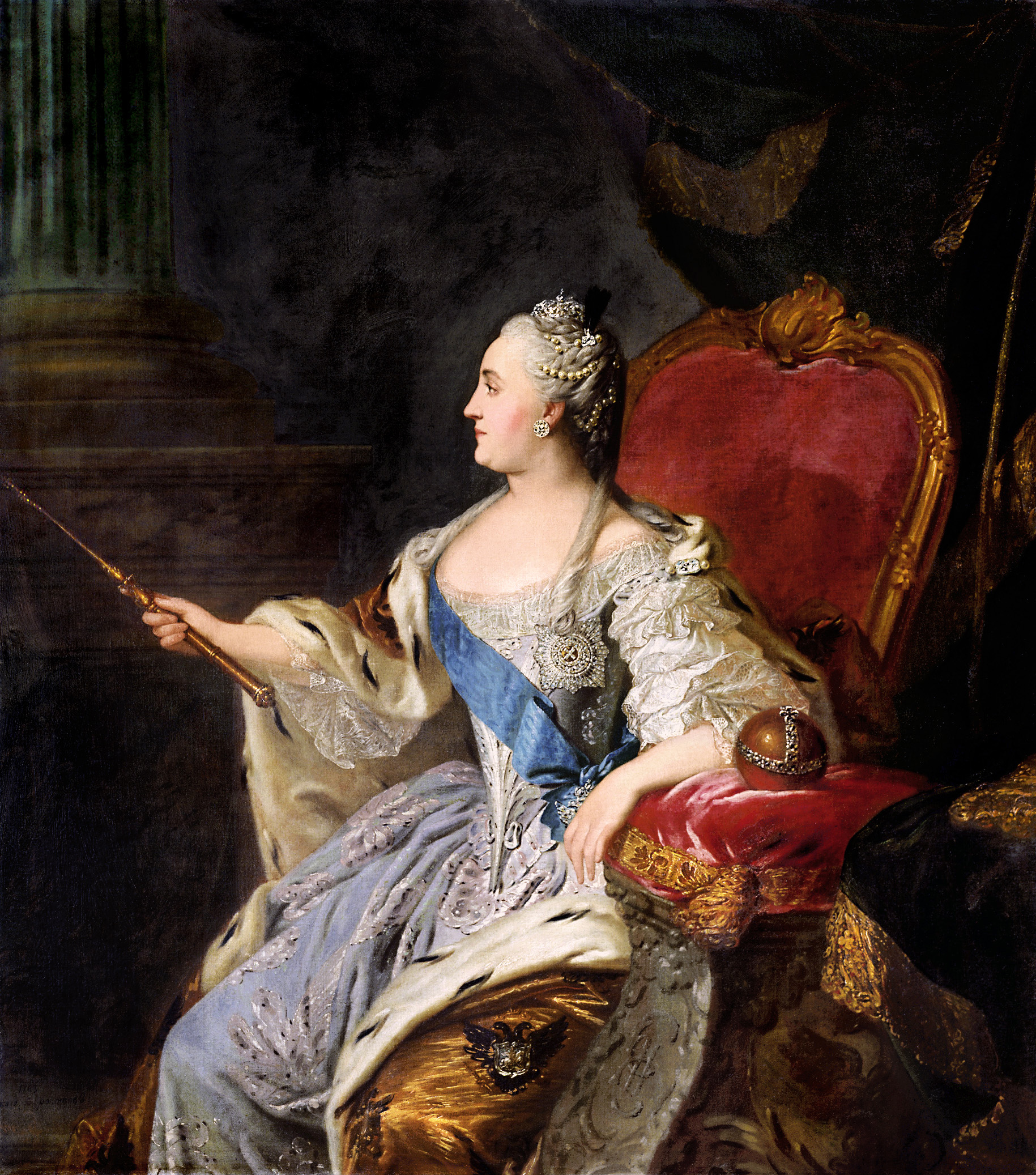
Empress Catherine II

In 1764, Catherine commissioned Yury Felten to build an extension on the east of the Winter Palace which he completed in 1766. Later it became the Southern Pavilion of the Small Hermitage. From 1767 to 1769, French architect Jean-Baptiste Vallin de la Mothe built the Northern Pavilion on the Neva embankment. Between 1767 and 1775, the extensions were connected by galleries, where Catherine put her collections. The entire neoclassical building is now known as the Small Hermitage. During the time of Catherine, the Hermitage was not a public museum and few people were allowed to view its holdings. Vallin de la Mothe also rebuilt rooms in the second story of the south-east corner block that was originally built for Elizabeth and later occupied by Peter III. The largest room in this particular apartment was the Audience Chamber (also called the Throne Hall) which consisted of 227 square meters.

The Hermitage buildings served as a home and workplace for nearly a thousand people, including the Imperial family. In addition to this, they also served as an extravagant showplace for all kinds of Russian relics and displays of wealth prior to the art collections. Many events were held in these buildings including masquerades for the nobility, grand receptions and ceremonies for state and government officials. The "Hermitage complex" was a creation of Catherine's that allowed all kinds of festivities to take place in the palace, the theatre and even the museum of the Hermitage. This helped solidify the Hermitage as not only a dwelling place for the Imperial family, but also as an important symbol and memorial to the imperial Russian state. Today, the palace and the museum are one and the same. In Catherine's day, the Winter Palace served as a central part of what was called the Palace Square. The Palace Square served as St. Petersburg's nerve centre by linking it to all the city's most important buildings. The presence of the Palace Square was extremely significant to the urban development of St. Petersburg, and while it became less of a nerve centre later into the 20th century, its symbolic value was still very much preserved.

Catherine acquired the best collections offered for sale by the heirs of prominent collectors. In 1769, she purchased Heinrich von Brühl's collection, consisting of over 600 paintings and a vast number of prints and drawings, in Saxony. Three years later, she bought Pierre Crozat's collection of paintings in France with the assistance of Denis Diderot. Next, in 1779, she acquired the collection of 198 paintings that once belonged to Robert Walpole in London followed by a collection of 119 paintings in Paris from Count Baudouin in 1781. Catherine's favourite items to collect were believed to be engraved gems and cameos. At the inaugural exhibit of the Hermitage, opened by Charles, Prince of Wales in November 2000, there was an entire gallery devoted to representing and displaying Catherine's favourite items. In this gallery her cameos are displayed along with cabinet made by David Roentgen, which holds her engraved gems. As the symbol of Minerva was frequently used and favoured by Catherine to represent her patronage of the arts, a cameo of Catherine as Minerva is also displayed here. This particular cameo was created for her by her daughter-in-law, the Grand Duchess Maria Feodorovna. This is only a small representation of Catherine's vast collection of many antique and contemporary engraved gems and cameos.

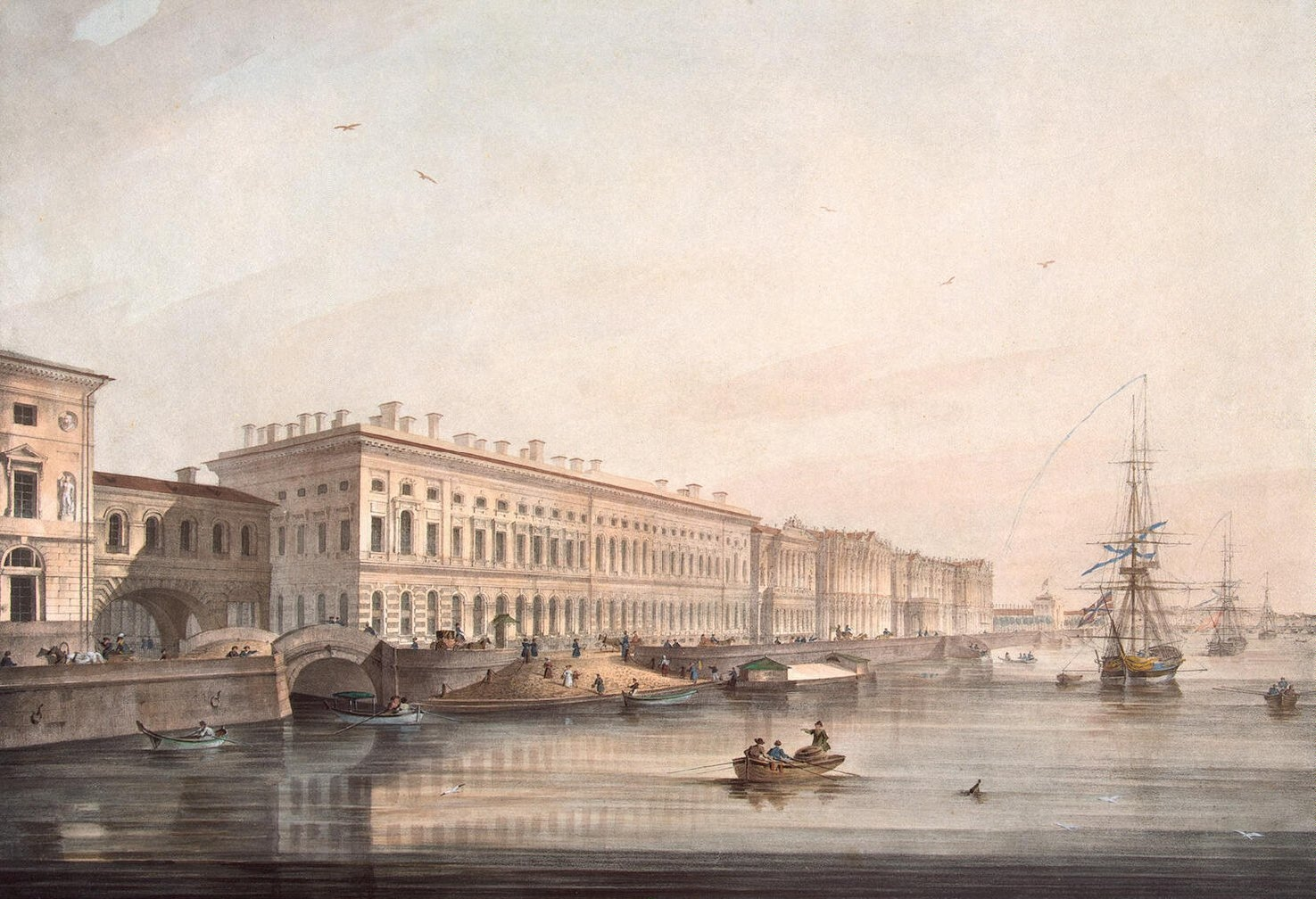
View of the Palace Embankment by Karl Beggrov, 1826. The Old Hermitage is in the centre of the painting.

The collection soon overgrew the building. In her lifetime, Catherine acquired 4,000 paintings from the old masters, 38,000 books, 10,000 engraved gems, 10,000 drawings, 16,000 coins and medals, and a natural history collection filling two galleries, so in 1771 she commissioned Yury Felten to build another major extension. The neoclassical building was completed in 1787 and has come to be known as the Large Hermitage or Old Hermitage. Catherine also gave the name of the Hermitage to her private theatre, built nearby between 1783 and 1787 by the Italian architect Giacomo Quarenghi. In London in 1787, Catherine acquired the collection of sculpture that belonged to Lyde Browne, mostly Ancient Roman marbles. Catherine used them to adorn the Catherine Palace and park in Tsarskoye Selo, but later they became the core of the Classical Antiquities collection of the Hermitage. From 1787 to 1792, Quarenghi designed and built a wing along the Winter Canal with the Raphael Loggias to replicate the loggia in the Apostolic Palace in Rome designed by Donato Bramante and frescoed by Raphael.

Catherine's collection of at least 4,000 paintings came to rival the older and more prestigious museums of Western Europe. Catherine took great pride in her collection and actively participated in extensive competitive art gathering and collecting that was prevalent in European royal court culture. Through her art collection she gained European acknowledgment and acceptance and portrayed Russia as an enlightened society. Catherine went on to invest much of her identity in being a patron of the arts. She was particularly fond of the Roman deity Minerva, whose characteristics according to classical tradition are military prowess, wisdom, and patronage of the arts. Using the title Catherine the Minerva, she created new institutions of literature and culture and also participated in many projects of her own, mostly play writing. The representation of Catherine alongside Minerva would come to be a tradition of enlightened patronage in Russia.

=== Expansion in the 19th century ===
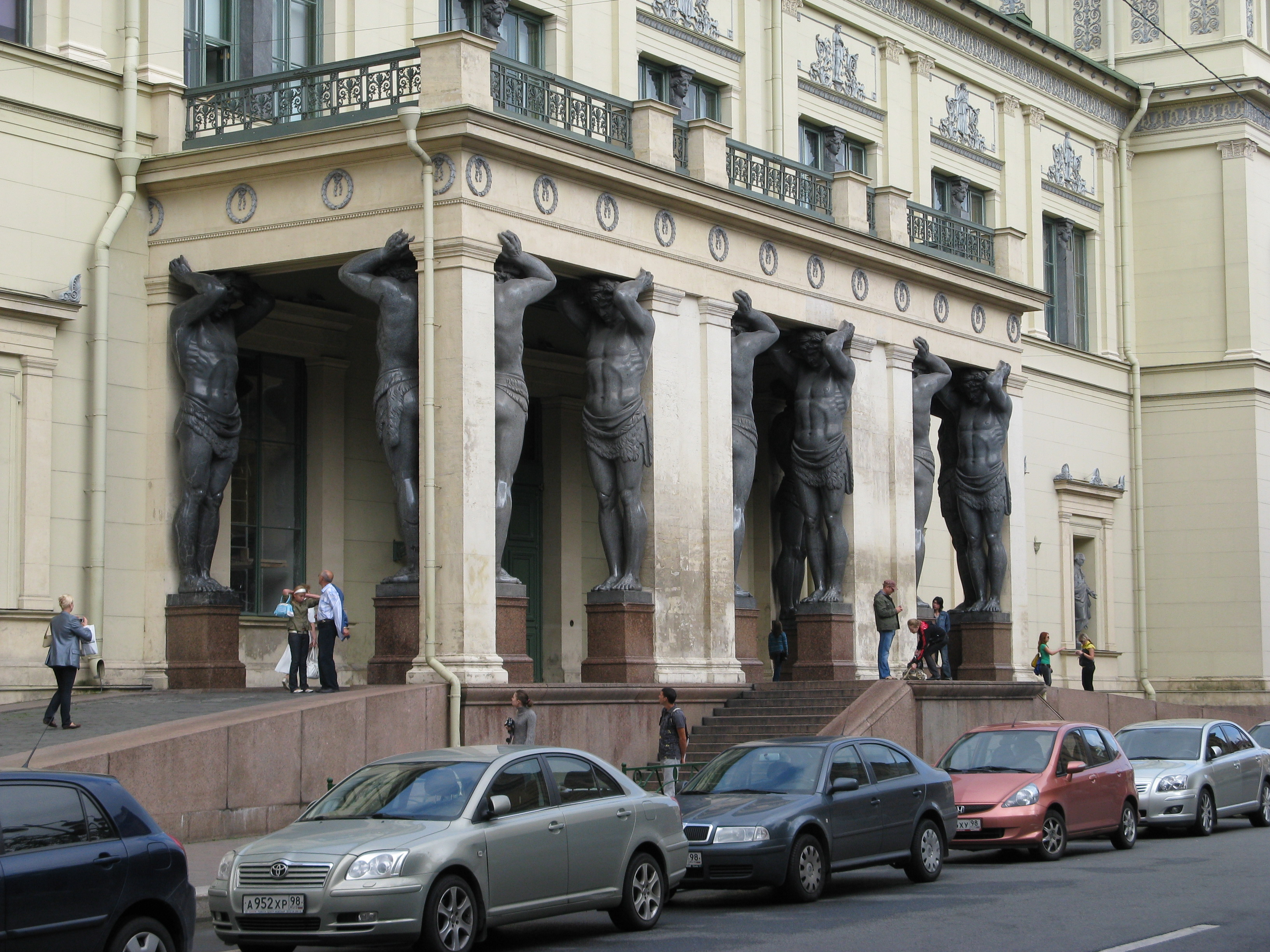
Portico with atlantes, historical entrance

In 1815, Alexander I of Russia purchased 38 pictures from the heirs of Joséphine de Beauharnais, most of which had been looted by the French in Kassel during the war. The Hermitage collection of Rembrandts was then considered the largest in the world. Also among Alexander's purchases from Josephine's estate were the first four sculptures by the neoclassical Italian sculptor Antonio Canova to enter the Hermitage collection.

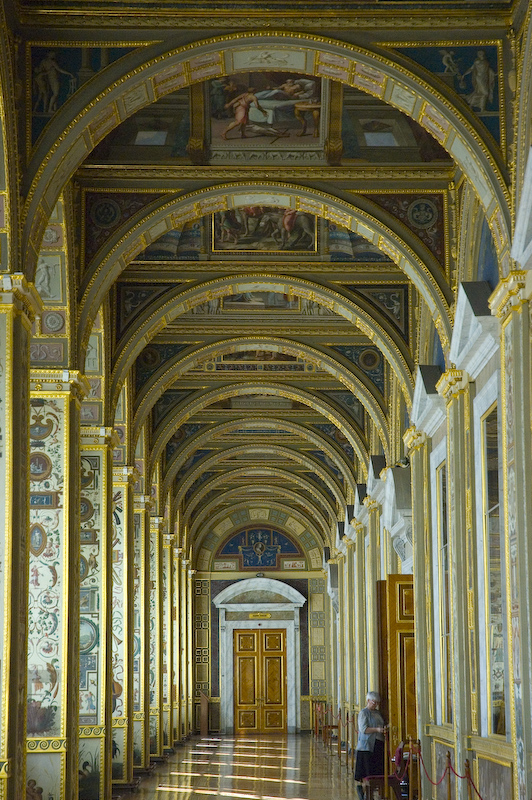
The Raphael Loggias

Between 1840 and 1843, Vasily Stasov redesigned the interiors of the Southern Pavilion of the Small Hermitage. In 1838, Nicholas I commissioned the neoclassical German architect Leo von Klenze to design a building for the public museum. Space for the museum was made next to the Small Hermitage by the demolition of the Shepelev Palace and royal stables. The construction was overseen by the Russian architects Vasily Stasov and Nikolai Yefimov from 1842 to 1851 and incorporated Quarenghi's wing with the Raphael Loggias.

The New Hermitage was opened to the public on 5 February 1852. In the same year the Egyptian Collection of the Hermitage Museum emerged and was particularly enriched by items given by the Duke of Leuchtenberg, Nicholas I's son-in-law. Meanwhile, from 1851 to 1860, the interiors of the Old Hermitage were redesigned by Andrei Stackensneider to accommodate the State Assembly, Cabinet of Ministers and state apartments. Stakenschneider created the Pavilion Hall in the Northern Pavilion of the Small Hermitage from 1851 to 1858.

In 1861, the Hermitage purchased from the Papal government part of the Giampietro Campana collection, which consisted mostly classical antiquities. These included over 500 vases, 200 bronzes and a number of marble statues. The Hermitage acquired Madonna Litta, which was then attributed to Leonardo, in 1865, and Raphael's Connestabile Madonna in 1870. In 1884 in Paris, Alexander III of Russia acquired the collection of Alexander Basilewski, featuring European medieval and Renaissance artefacts. In 1885, the Arsenal collection of arms and armour, founded by Alexander I of Russia, was transferred from the Catherine Palace in Tsarskoye Selo to the Hermitage. In 1914, Leonardo's Benois Madonna was added to the collection.

=== After the October Revolution ===
Immediately after the Revolution of 1917, the Imperial Hermitage and the Winter Palace, the former Imperial residence, were proclaimed state museums and eventually merged.

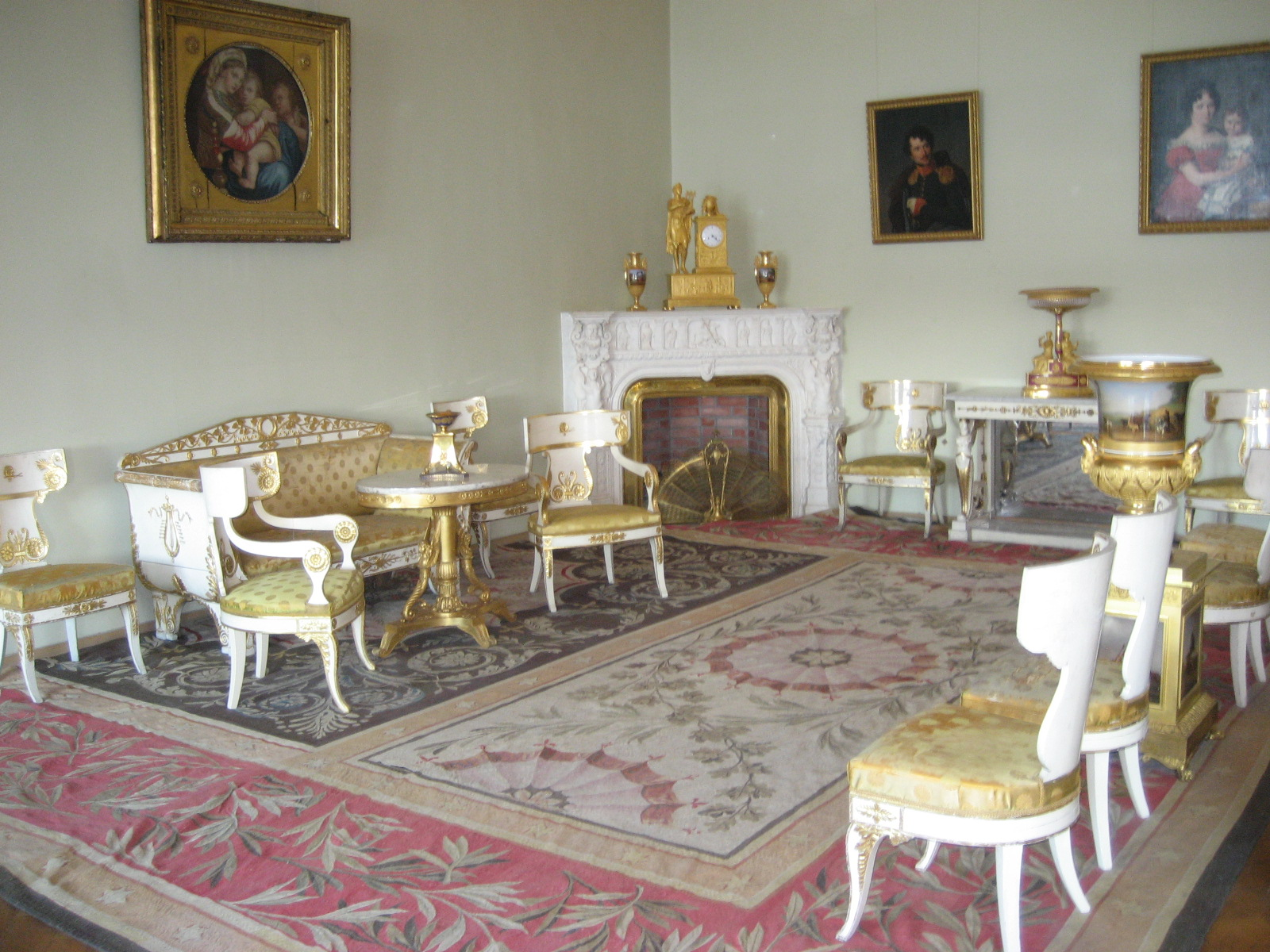
A room in the Winter Palace

The range of the Hermitage's exhibits was further expanded when private art collections from several palaces of the Russian Tsars and numerous private mansions were nationalised and redistributed among major Soviet state museums. Particularly notable was the influx of old masters from the Catherine Palace, the Alexander Palace, the Stroganov Palace, and the Yusupov Palace, as well as from other palaces of Saint Petersburg and suburbs.

In 1922, a collection of 19th-century European paintings was transferred to the Hermitage from the Academy of Arts. In turn, in 1927 about 500 important paintings were transferred to the Central Museum of old Western art in Moscow at the insistence of the Soviet authorities.

In 1928, the Soviet government ordered the Hermitage to compile a list of valuable works of art for export. From 1930 to 1934, over two thousand works of art from the Hermitage collection were clandestinely sold at auctions abroad or directly to foreign officials and businesspeople. The sold items included Raphael's Alba Madonna, Titian's Venus with a Mirror, and Jan van Eyck's Annunciation, among other world known masterpieces by Botticelli, Rembrandt, Van Dyck, and others. In 1931 Andrew W. Mellon acquired 21 works of art from the Hermitage and later donated them to form a nucleus of the National Gallery of Art in Washington, D.C. (see also Soviet sale of Hermitage paintings).

During the later 1930s USSR Great Purge, the museum staff were investigated by the NKVD for anti-Soviet activities. Staff with links to the pre-revolutionary aristocracy were sent into internal exile as socially dangerous persons, with a few going to gulag labour camps. The harshest investigation was into the Oriental Department. Under torture Dmitry Zhukov denounced Nikolai Nevsky as a member of a Japanese spy ring; both were executed in November 1938.

Soviet ski troops by the portico during the Siege of Leningrad

With the German invasion of the Soviet Union in 1941, before the Siege of Leningrad started, two trains with a considerable part of the collections were evacuated to Sverdlovsk. Two bombs and a number of shells hit the museum buildings during the siege. The museum opened an exhibition in November 1944. In October 1945 the evacuated collections were brought back, and in November 1945 the museum reopened.

In 1948, 316 works of Impressionist, post-Impressionist, and modern art from the collection of the Museum of New Western Art in Moscow, originating mostly from the nationalised collections of Sergei Shchukin and Ivan Morozov before the war, were transferred to the Hermitage, including works by Matisse and Picasso.

On 15 June 1985, a man later judged insane attacked Rembrandt's painting Danaë, displayed in the museum. He threw sulphuric acid on the canvas and cut it twice with a knife. The restoration of the painting had been accomplished by Hermitage conservationists by 1997, and Danaë is now on display behind armoured glass.

=== The Hermitage since 1991 ===
In 1991, it became known that some paintings looted by the Red Army in Germany in 1945 were held in the Hermitage. But only in October 1994 did the Hermitage officially announce that it had secretly been holding a major trove of French Impressionist and Post-Impressionist paintings from German private collections. The exhibition Hidden Treasures Revealed, in which 74 of the paintings were displayed for the first time, was opened on 30 March 1995 in the Nicholas Hall of the Winter Palace and lasted a year. Of the paintings, all but one originated from private rather than state German collections, including 56 paintings from the Otto Krebs collection, as well as the collection of Bernhard Koehler and paintings previously belonging to Otto Gerstenberg and his daughter Margarete Scharf, including the world-famous Place de la Concorde by Degas, In the Garden by Renoir, and White House at Night by Van Gogh. Some of the paintings are now on permanent display in several small rooms in the northeastern corner of the Winter Palace on the first floor.

In 1993, the Russian government gave the eastern wing of the nearby General Staff Building across the Palace Square to the Hermitage and the new exhibition rooms in 1999. Since 2003, the Great Courtyard of the Winter Palace has been open to the public.

In 2003, the Hermitage loaned 142 pieces to the University of Michigan Museum of Art for an exhibition titled The Romanovs Collect: European Art from the Hermitage.

In December 2004, the museum discovered another looted work of art: Venus Disarming Mars by Rubens was once in the collection of the Rheinsberg Palace near Berlin, and was apparently looted by Soviet troops from the Königsberg Castle in East Prussia in 1945. At the time, Mikhail Piotrovsky said the painting would be cleaned and displayed.

The museum announced in July 2006 that 221 minor items, including jewellery, Orthodox icons, silverware and richly enamelled objects, had been stolen. The value of the stolen items was estimated to be approximately US$543,000. By the end of 2006 several of the stolen items had been recovered.

== Dependencies ==
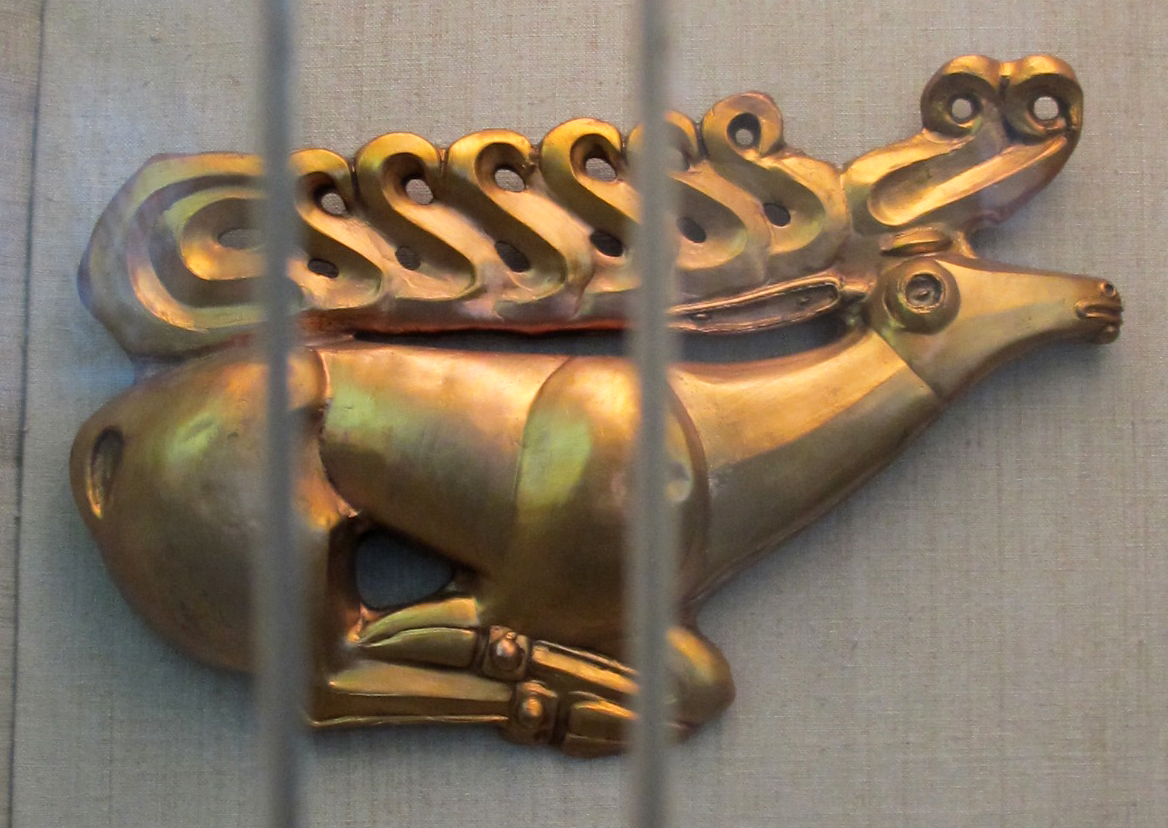
Deer golden plaque from Krasnodar, beginning of 6th century BC

In recent years, the Hermitage launched several dependencies abroad and domestically.

=== Hermitage-Kazan Exhibition Centre ===
The Hermitage dependency in Kazan (Tatarstan, Russia), opened in 2005. It was created with support from President of the Republic of Tatarstan Mintimer Shaimiev and is a subdivision of the Kazan Kremlin State Historical and Architectural Museum-Park. The museum is situated in the Kazan Kremlin in an edifice previously occupied by the Junker School built in the beginning of the 19th century.

=== Ermitage Italia, Ferrara ===
Following the prior experiences in London, Las Vegas, Amsterdam, and Kazan, the Hermitage foundation decided to create a further branch in Italy with the launch of a national bid. Several northern Italian cities expressed interest such as Verona, Mantua, Ferrara and Turin. In 2007, the honour was awarded to the city of Ferrara which proposed its Castle Estense as the base. Since then, the new institution called Ermitage Italia started a research and scientific collaboration with the Hermitage foundation.

=== Hermitage-Vyborg Centre ===
Hermitage-Vyborg Centre was opened in June 2010 in Vyborg, Leningrad Oblast.

=== Hermitage Exhibition Centre, Vladivostok ===
A Hermitage branch was due to open in Vladivostok by 2016, and the regional government had allocated more than Rb17.7 million (US$558,000) for preliminary reconstruction work on a mansion in Vladivostok's historic downtown district to house the satellite.

=== Hermitage-Siberia, Omsk ===
The Hermitage-Siberia is due to open in Omsk in 2016.

=== Guggenheim Hermitage Museum, Vilnius ===
In recent years, there have been proposals to open a Vilnius Guggenheim Hermitage Museum in the capital city of Lithuania. Like the former Las Vegas dependency, the museum is to combine artworks from the Saint Petersburg Hermitage with works from the New York Guggenheim Museum.

=== Former dependencies ===
==== Guggenheim Hermitage Museum, Las Vegas ====
The Guggenheim Hermitage Museum in Las Vegas opened on 7 October 2001 and closed on 11 May 2008. The Hermitage Rooms in London's Somerset House opened on 25 November 2000. In 2004, the rooms hosted Heaven on Earth: Art from Islamic Lands, a joint exhibition with the Khalili Collection of Islamic Art. The exhibition was closed permanently in November 2007 due to poor visitor numbers.

==== Hermitage Amsterdam ====
The dependency of the Hermitage Museum in Amsterdam was known as the 'Hermitage Amsterdam', and was located in the former Amstelhof building. It opened on 24 February 2004 in a small building on the Nieuwe Herengracht in Amsterdam, awaiting the closing of the retirement home which still occupied the Amstelhof building until 2007. Between 2007 and 2009, the Amstelhof was renovated and made suitable for the housing of the Amsterdam Hermitage. The Amsterdam Hermitage was opened on 19 June 2009 by President Dmitry Medvedev and Queen Beatrix of the Netherlands. Following Russia's 2022 invasion of Ukraine, the Amsterdam Hermitage severed ties with St. Petersburg, being renamed to H'ART Museum the following year.

== Management ==
=== Hermitage directors ===
- Florian Gilles
- Stepan Gedeonov (1863–78)
- Alexander Vasilchikov (1879–88)
- Sergei Nikitich Trubetskoi (1888–99)
- Ivan Vsevolozhsky (1899–1909)
- Dmitry Tolstoi (1909–1918)
- Boris Legran (1931–1934)
- Iosif Orbeli (1934–1951)
- Mikhail Artamonov (1951–1964)
- Boris Piotrovsky (1964–1990)
- Mikhail Piotrovsky (1992–present)

=== Volunteer service ===
The Hermitage Volunteer Service allows people to volunteer in helping to run the museum. The program aids the Hermitage with its external and internal activities and serves as an informal link between the museum staff and the public, bringing the specific knowledge of the museum's experts to the community. Volunteers may also develop projects reflecting personal goals and interests.

=== Cats ===
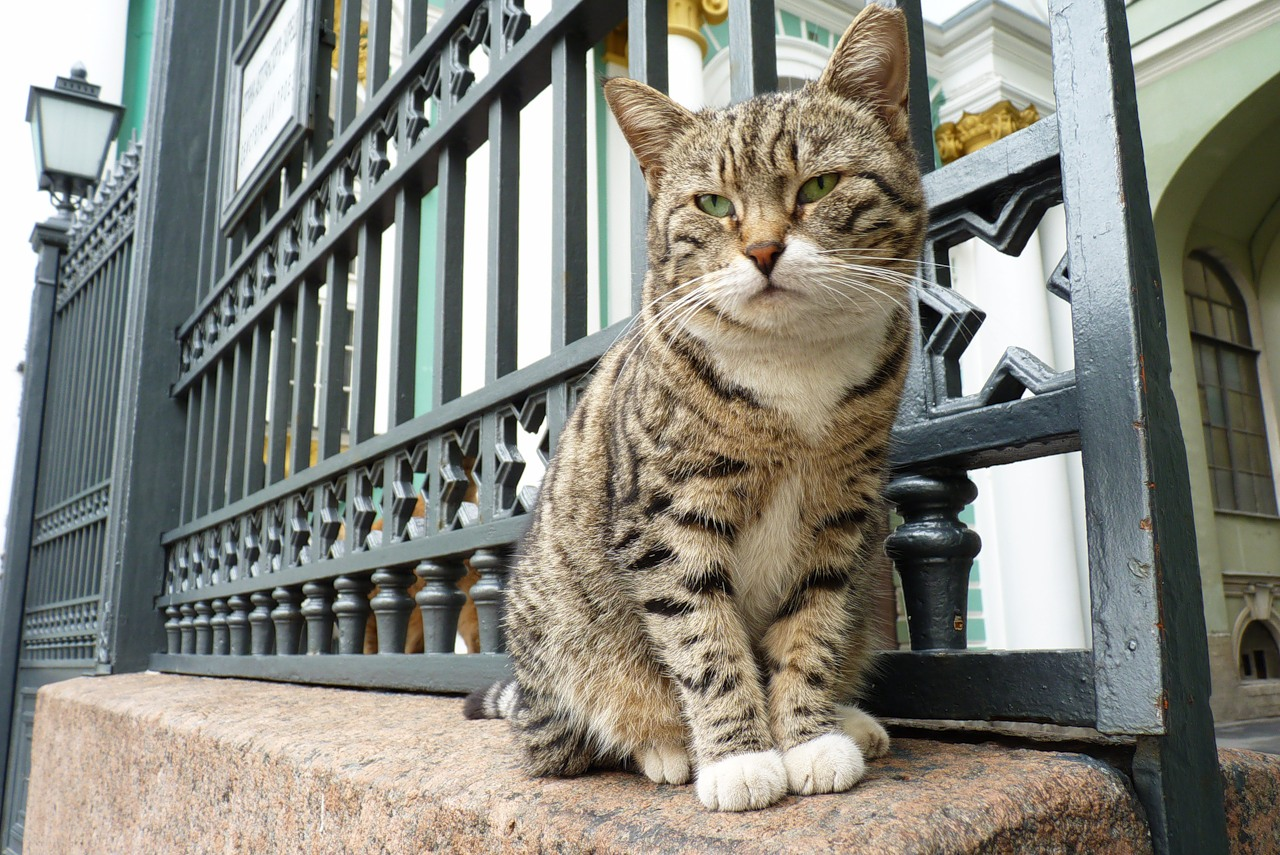
One of the Hermitage cats

A population of cats lives on the museum grounds and serves as an attraction.

== In popular culture ==
=== Films ===
- Russian Ark (2002), the Russian film by Alexander Sokurov, was filmed entirely in the Hermitage Museum, showing the Winter Palace at various stages of its history.
- War and Peace (1966–67), an Oscar-winning Soviet adaptation of the 1869 novel by Leo Tolstoy, was partially filmed in the Winter Palace.

=== Television ===
Russia-K, a Russian national television channel, has been presenting the various art collections of the Hermitage to the general public for years. There are a series of programs that have aired entitled My Hermitage that have been particularly successful. All of these programs are organised by the Director of the Hermitage, Professor Mikhail Piotrovsky, and are quite similar to the broadcasts created by Academician Boris Piotrovsky, who is Mikhail's father. These programs were first broadcast through the Soviet Union's 'First' channel, airing at the height of the museum's boom. During this time, this channel recorded more than three million visitors every year, mostly from the Soviet Union. Another program created by the Hermitage was called The Treasures of St. Petersburg, and was broadcast on the St. Petersburg regional television. This program gave insight into what exhibitions were being displayed at the Hermitage.

Treasures of St Petersburg & The Hermitage (2003), a three-part documentary series for Channel 5 in the UK, directed by Graham Addicott and produced by Pille Runk.

Hermitage Revealed (2014) is a BBC documentary from Margy Kinmonth. The film tells the story of its journey from imperial palace to state museum, investigating remarkable tales of dedication, devotion, ownership and ultimate sacrifice, showing how the collection came about, how it survived tumultuous revolutionary times and what makes the Hermitage unique today.

In March 2020, Apple released a continuous 5 hour and 19 minute one shot film recorded entirely on an iPhone 11 Pro detailing many rooms of the museum which highlighted not only the artwork, but also the architecture, and live movement pieces interspersed throughout.

=== Literature ===
- To the Hermitage, a 2000 novel by Malcolm Bradbury, retells the story of Diderot's journey to Russia to meet Catherine the Great in her Hermitage.
- Petersburg, a 1913 novel by Andrey Bely, features the Winter Canal near the palace as one of its central locations, but never names the Winter Palace directly.
- Ghostwritten, by David Mitchell, features as one of its protagonists a woman who works for an art counterfeiting ring whilst masquerading as a docent in a gallery room on the upper floor of the Large Hermitage.
- The Madonnas of Leningrad, a novel by Debra Dean, features the Hermitage during World War II.
- Sancar Seckiner's 2017 book Thilda's House (Thilda'nın Evi) includes a chapter highlighting the writer's experience at the Hermitage Museum by indicating several masterworks of the 15th–19th centuries.

=== Games ===
- The Hermitage appears in the video games Civilization IV, Civilization V, Civilization VI and Civilization VII as a wonder of the world.
- The Hermitage appears in the first mission of the Soviet campaign in the video game Command and Conquer: Red Alert 3; it is under attack from forces of the Empire of the Rising Sun.

== Gallery ==
Selection of artwork collection

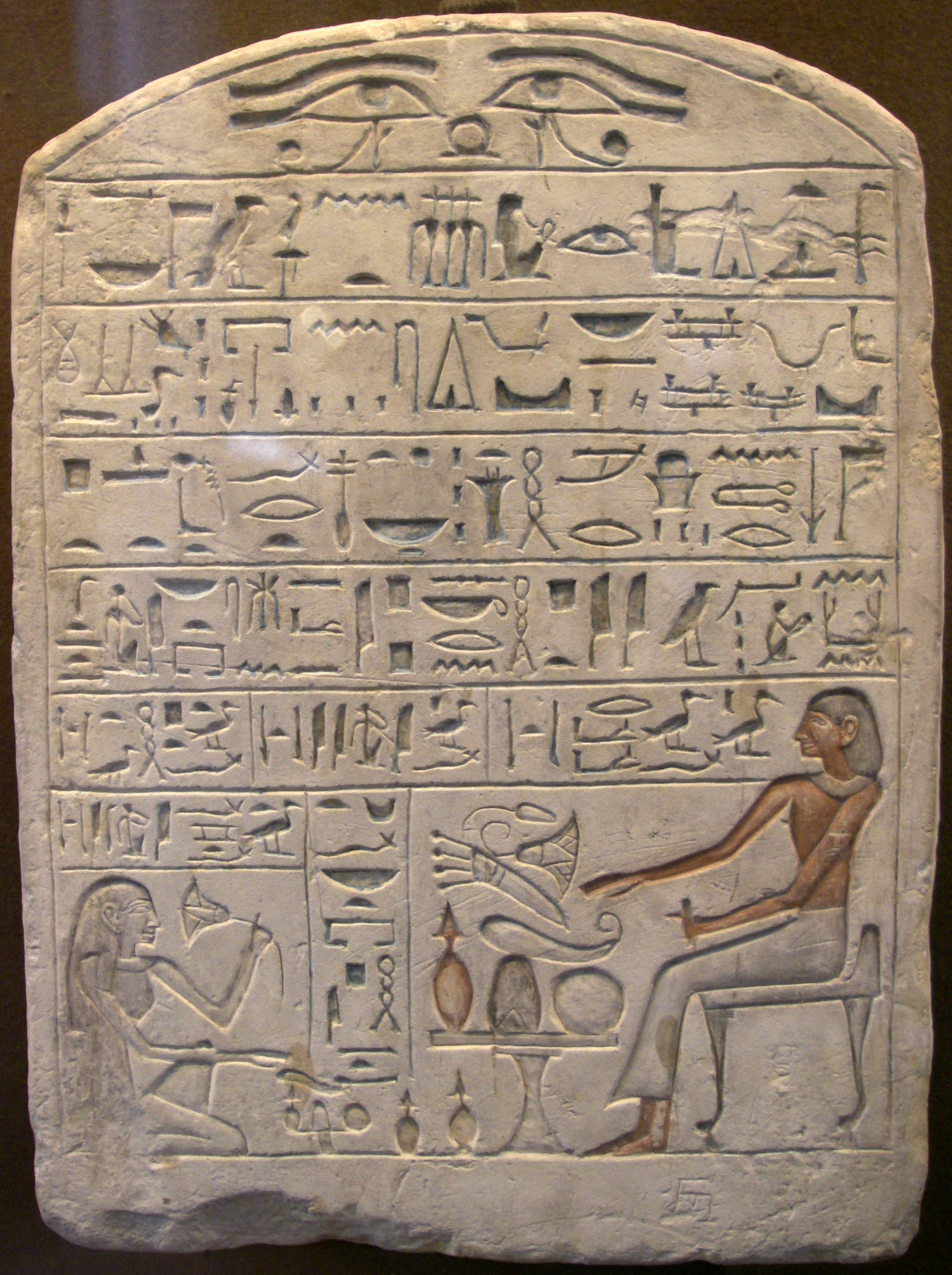
Ancient Egyptian: Limestone stele of a chief potter (18th century BC)

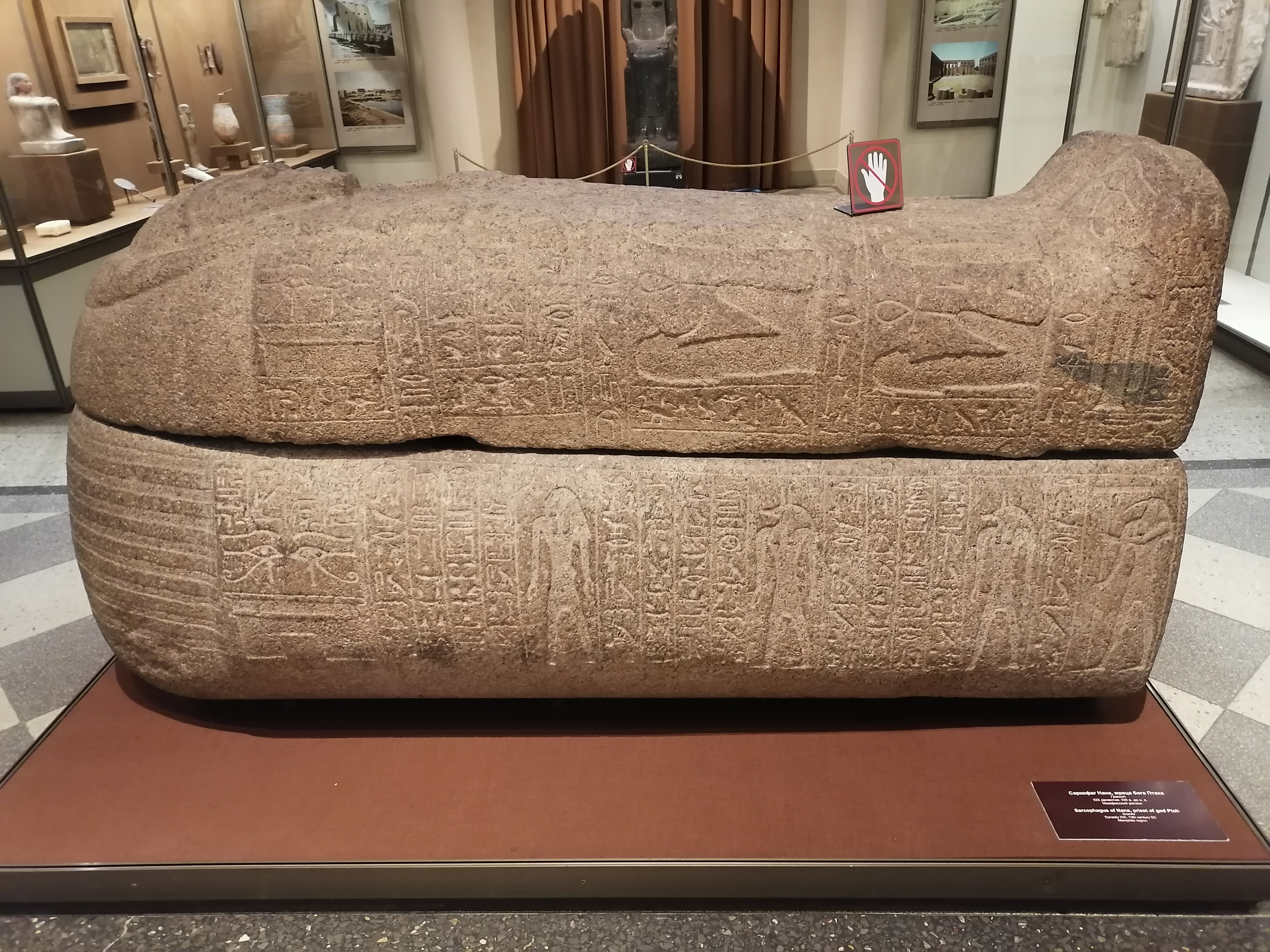
Ancient Egyptian: Sarcophagus of Nana, priest of god Ptah (13th century BC)

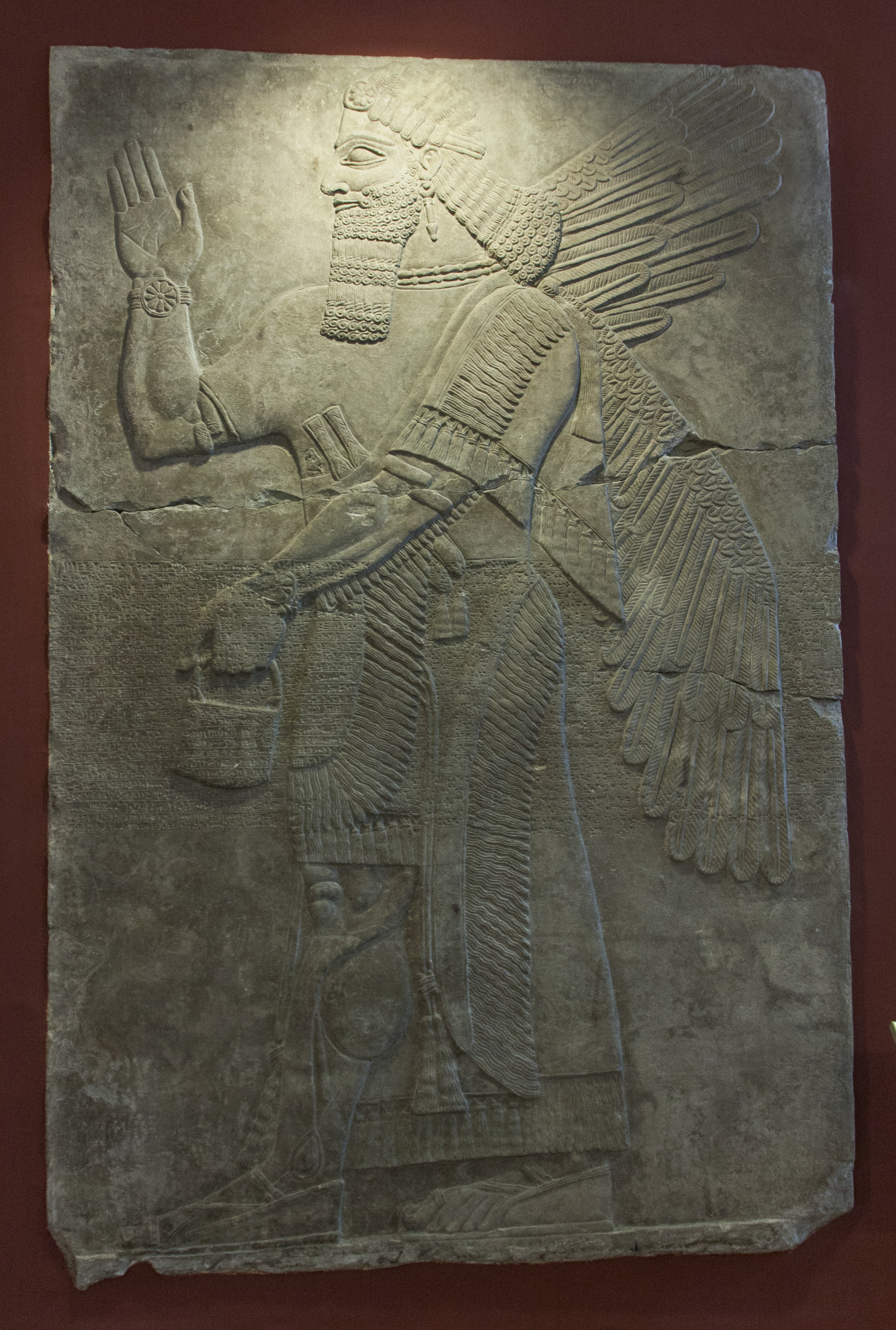
Ancient Mesopotamia (Neo-Assyrian): Relief from the palace of Ashurnasirpal II at Kalhu, Nimrud (9th century BC)

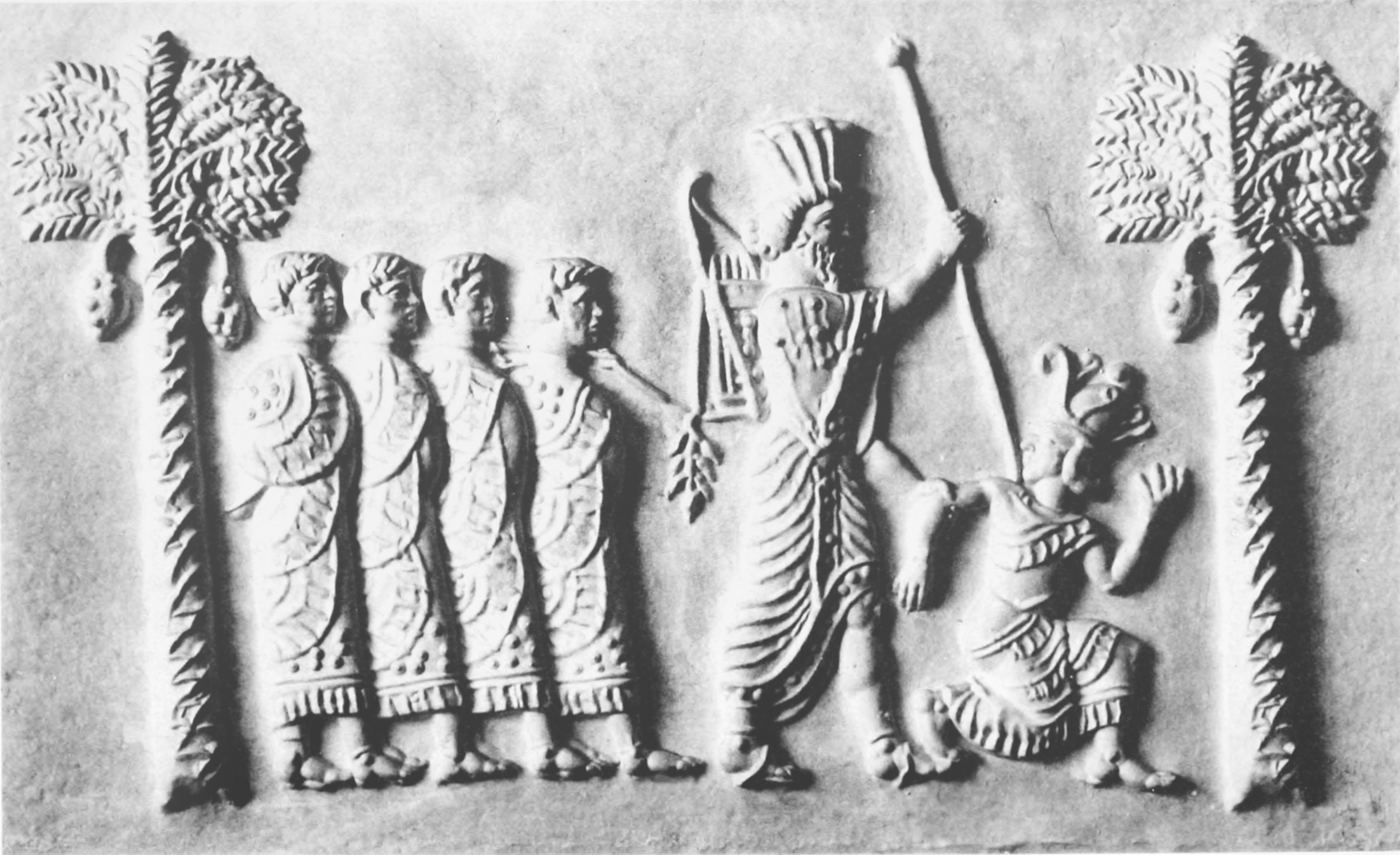
Achaemenid Persian: Zvenigorodsky seal (late 5th–early 4th century BC)

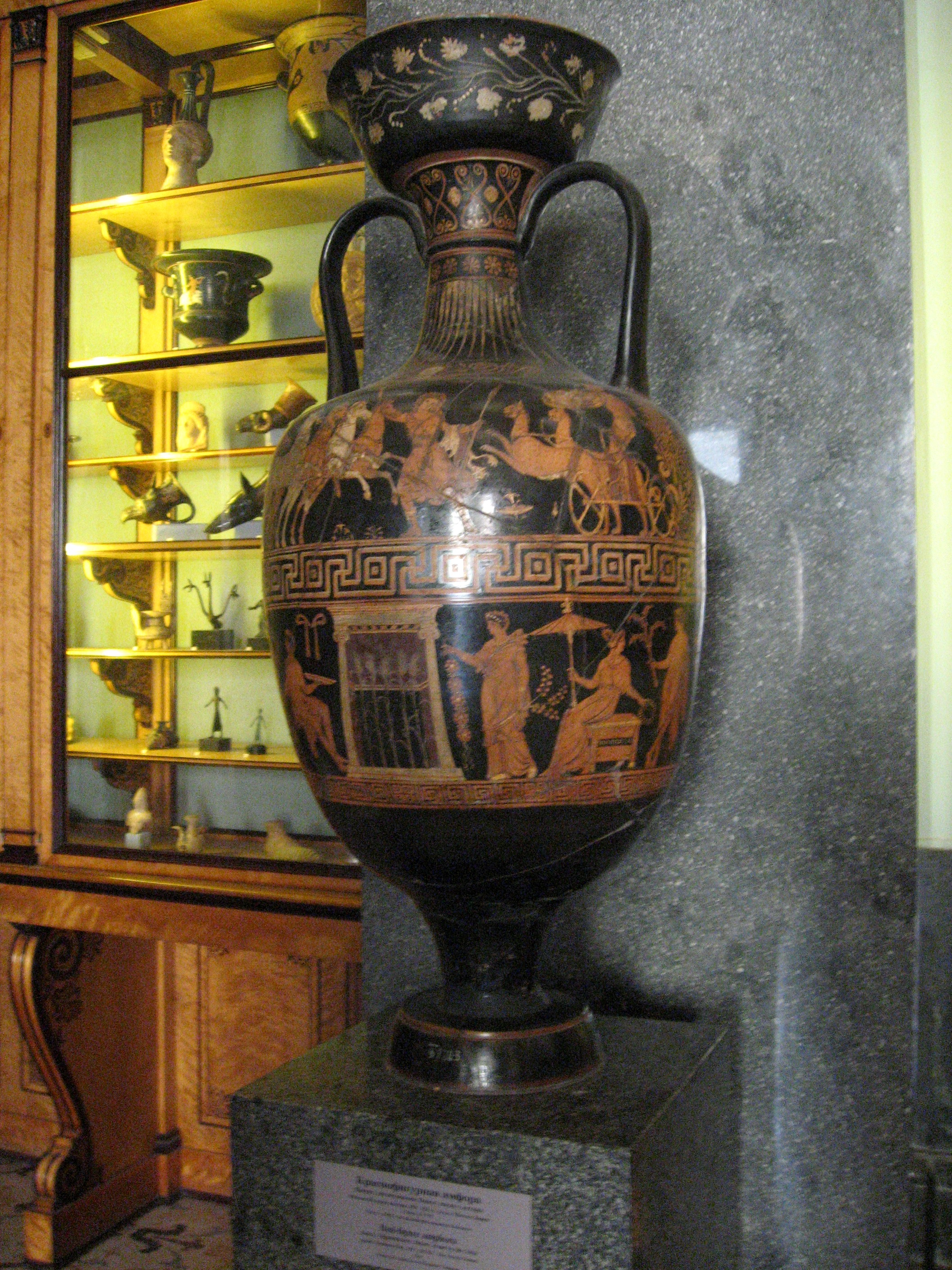
Ancient Greek: Red-figure vase (5th century BC)

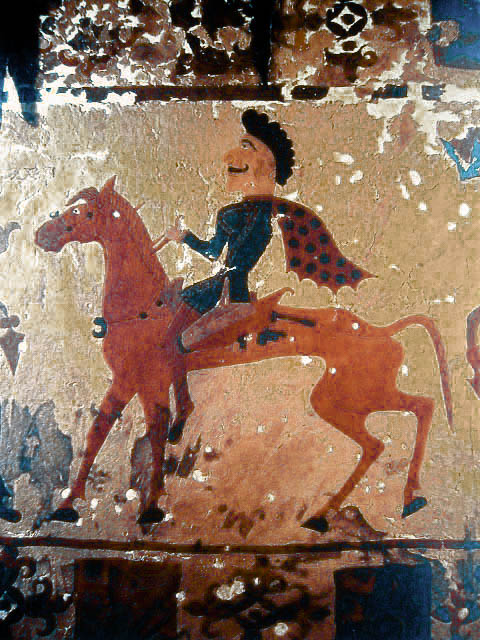
Ancient Steppes: Pazyryk horseman (3rd century BC)

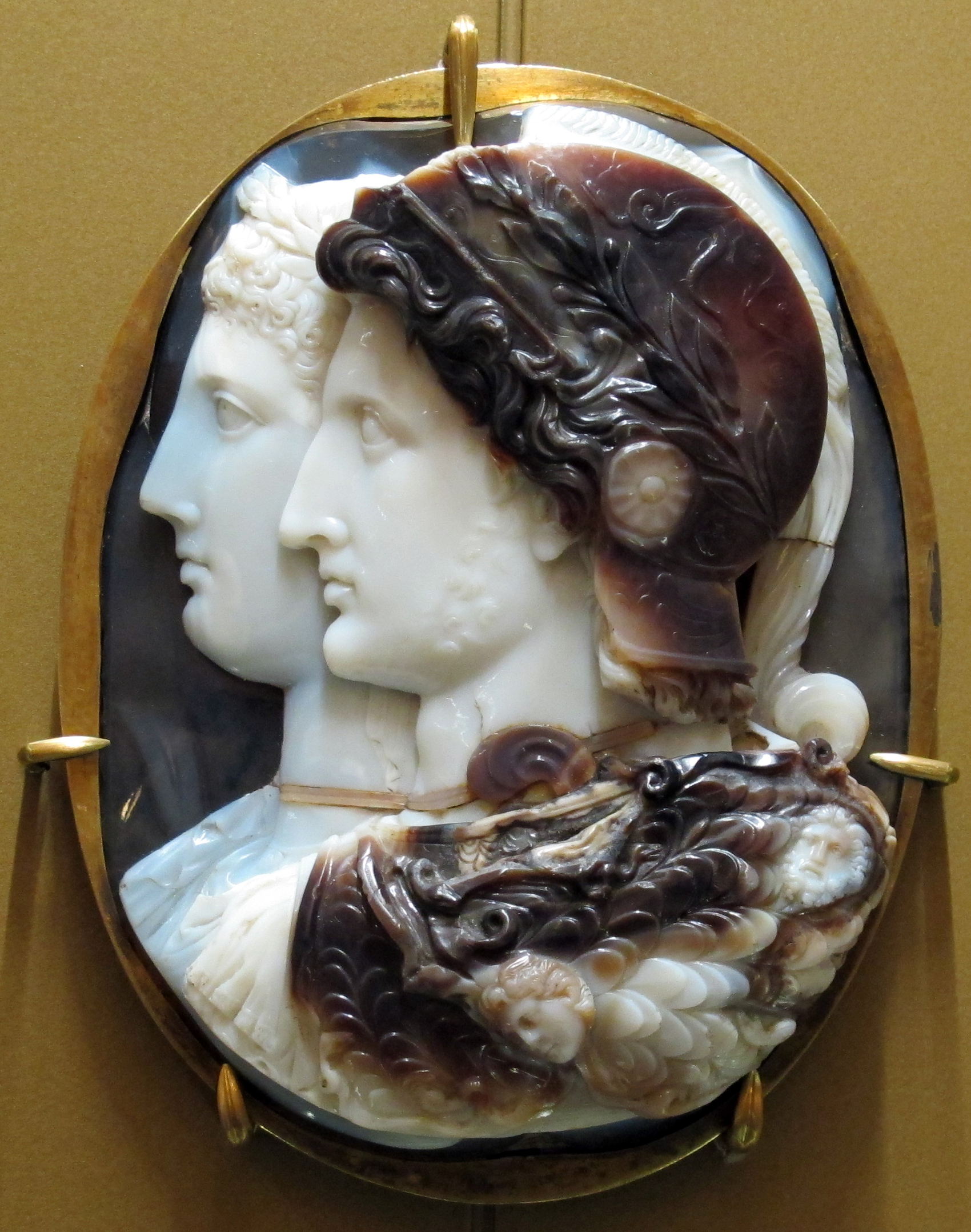
Hellenistic: Gonzaga Cameo (3rd century BC)

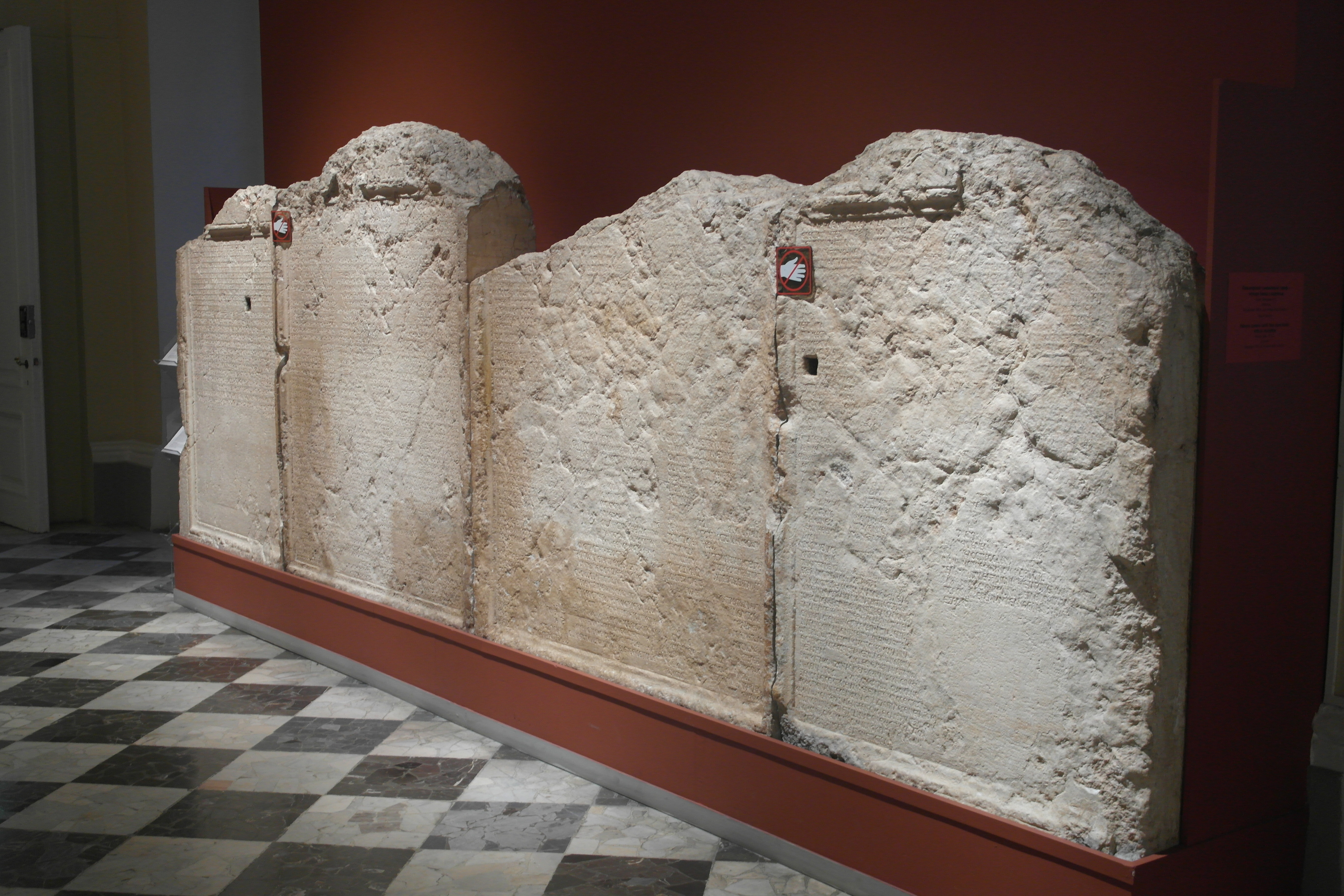
Palmyrene (Roman Syria): Palmyra Tariff (2nd century BC)

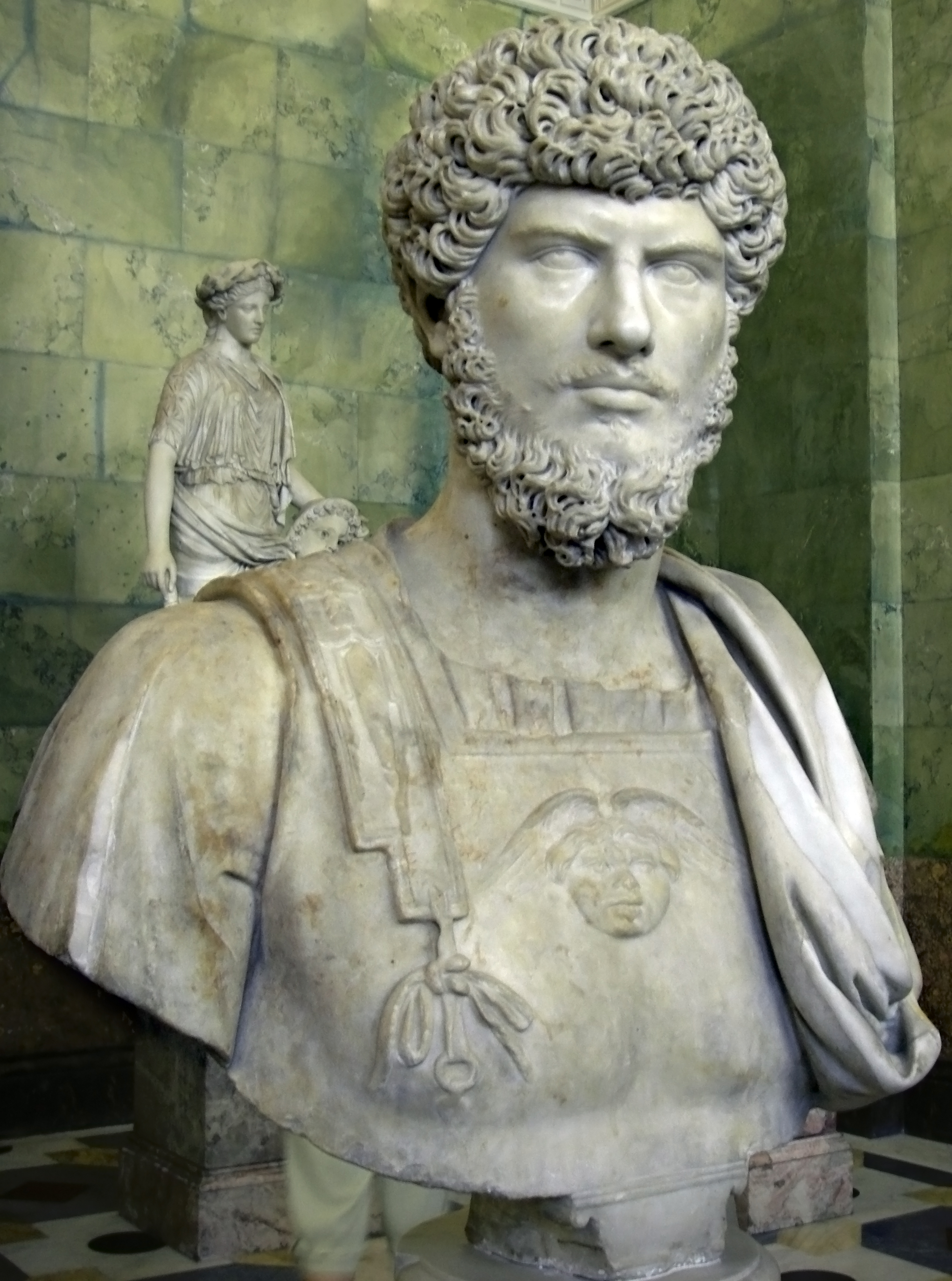
Ancient Roman: Bust of Lucius Verus (160–170)

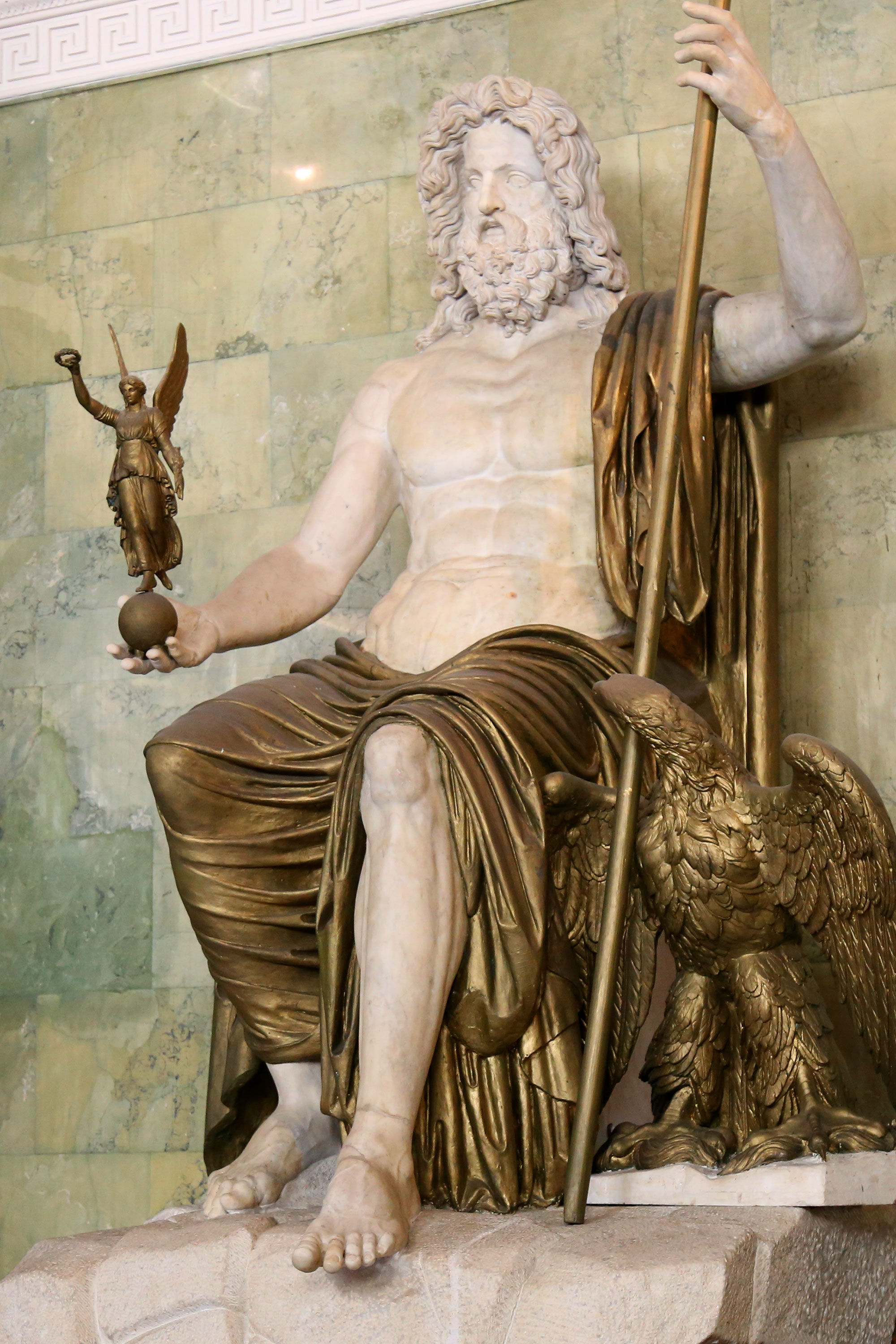
Ancient Roman: Statue of Jupiter (1st century AD)

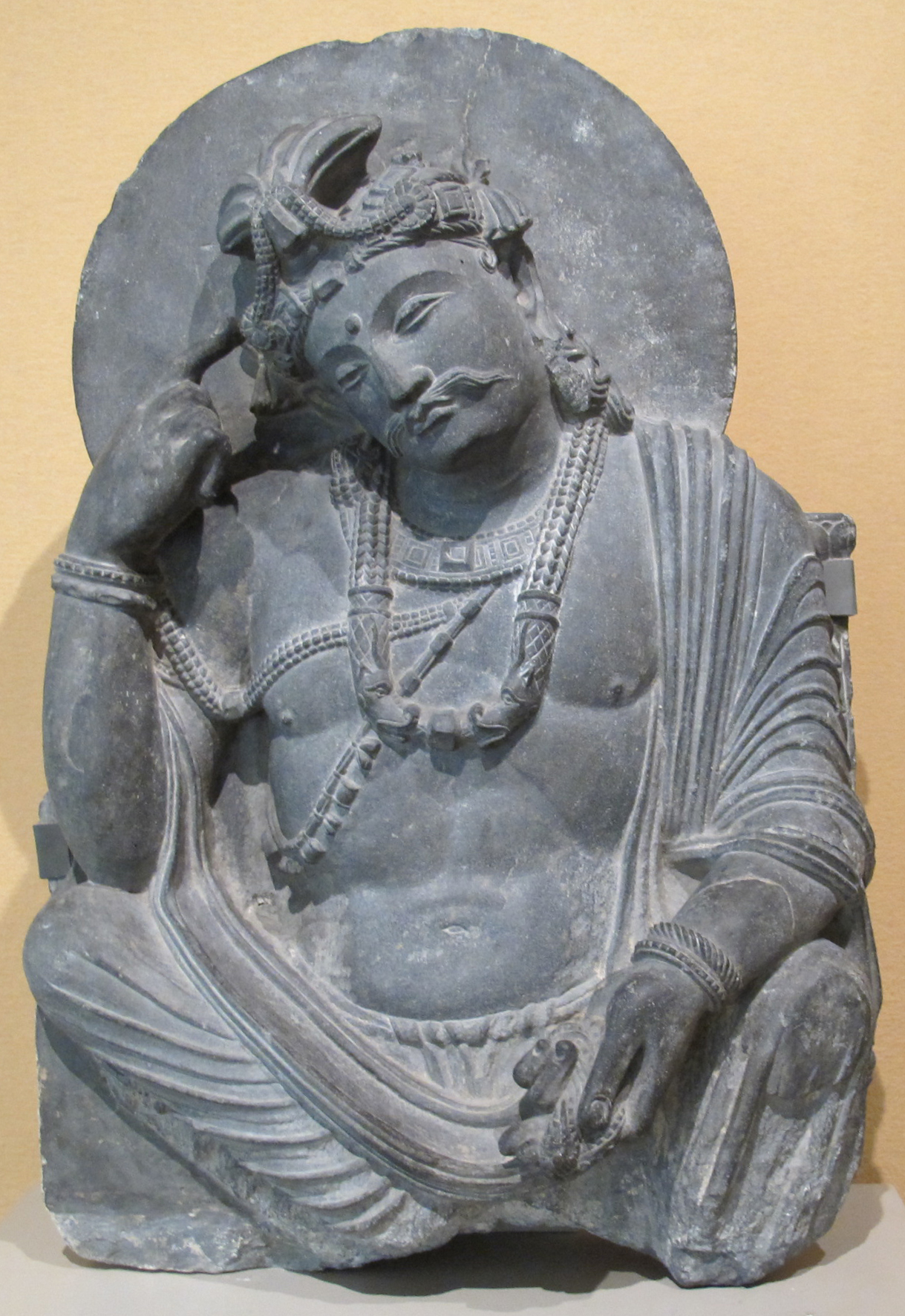
Indian: statue of Buddha (2nd–3rd century)

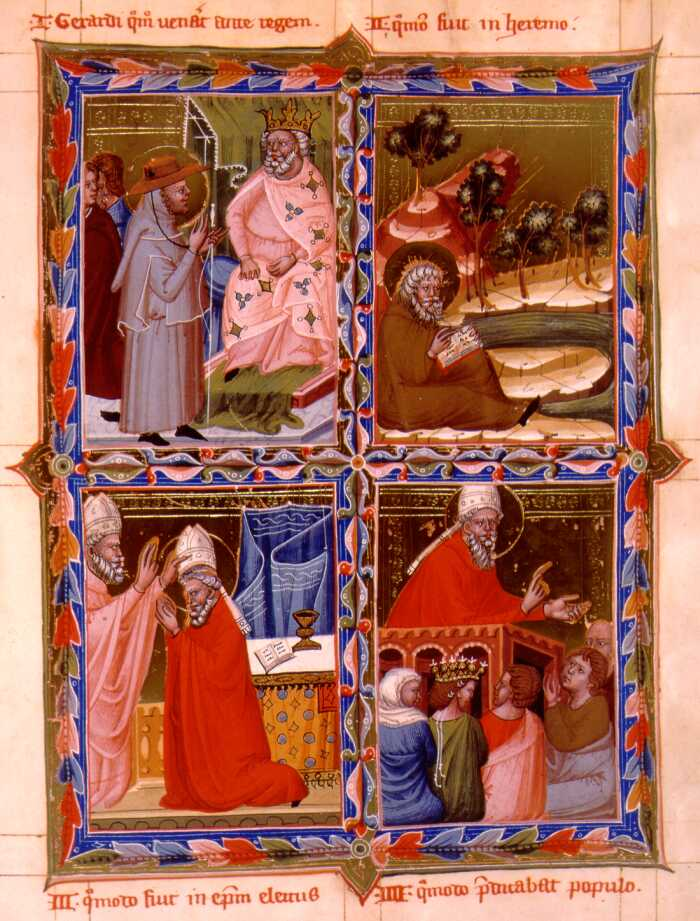
Gothic: Anjou Legendarium (1330)

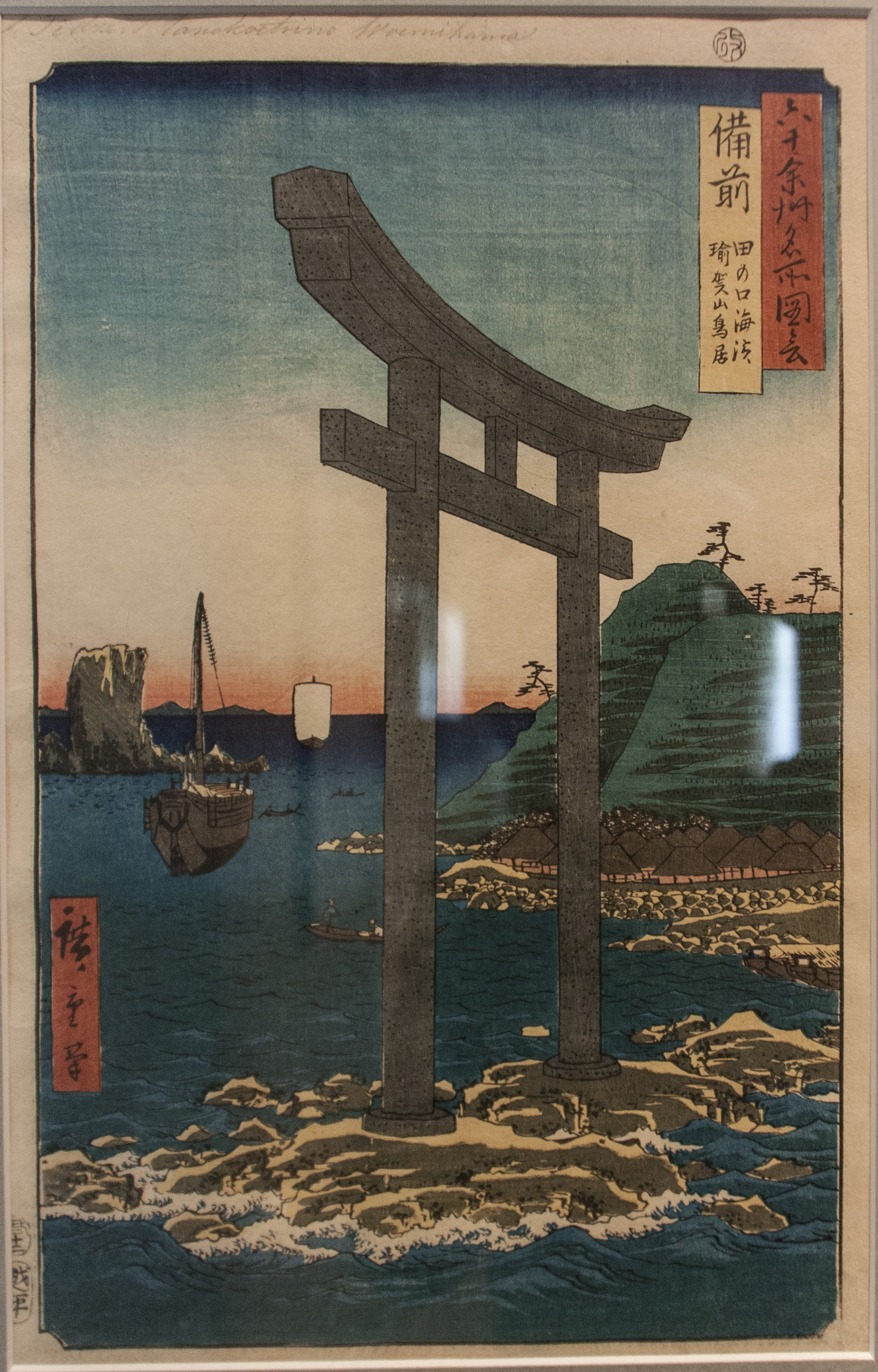
Japanese: Xylography from the series Pictures of the famous Places in sixty-odd Provinces (1853-1856)

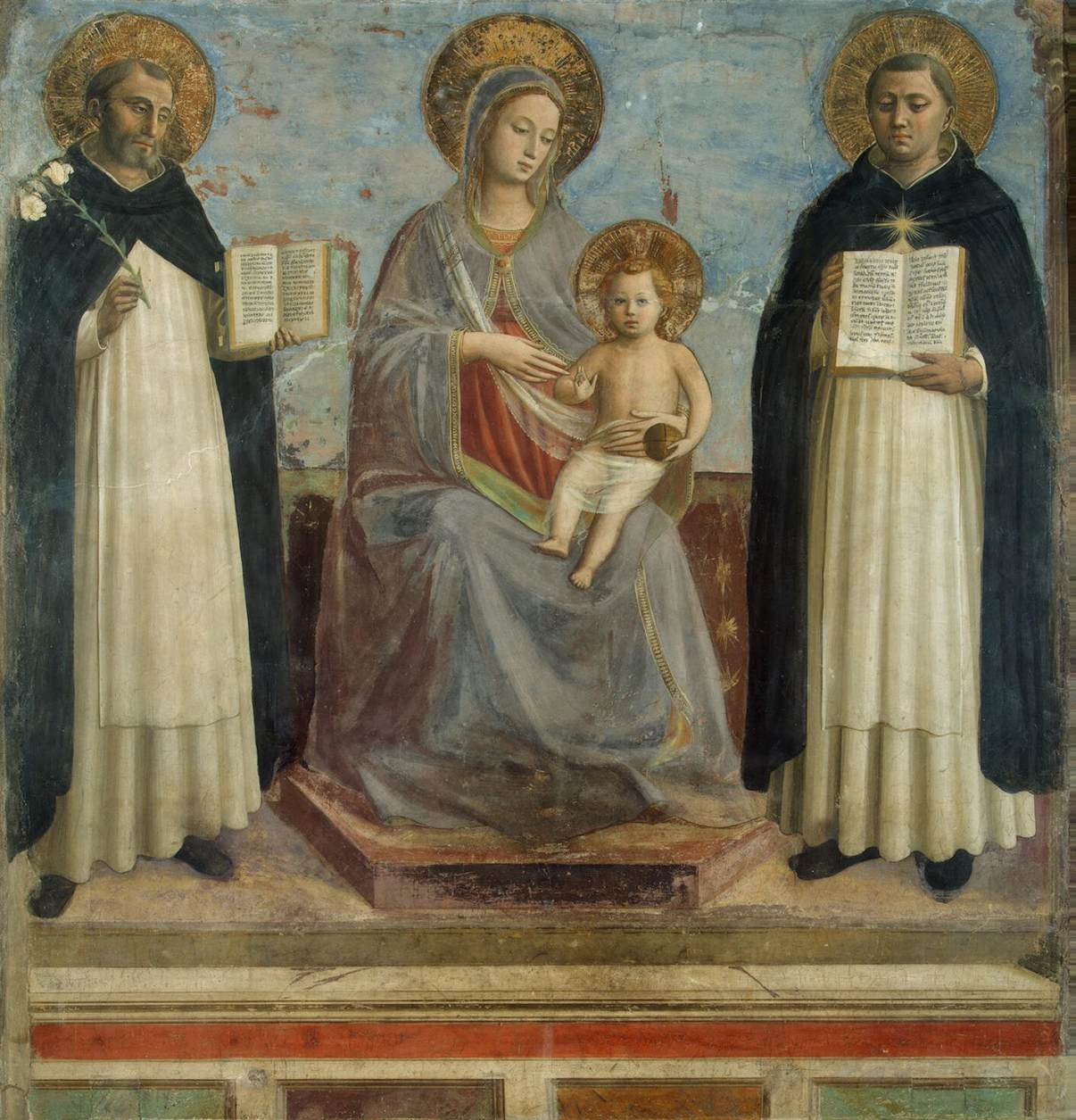
Early Renaissance: Madonna and Child with St Dominic and St Thomas Aquinas by Fra Angelico (c. 1435)

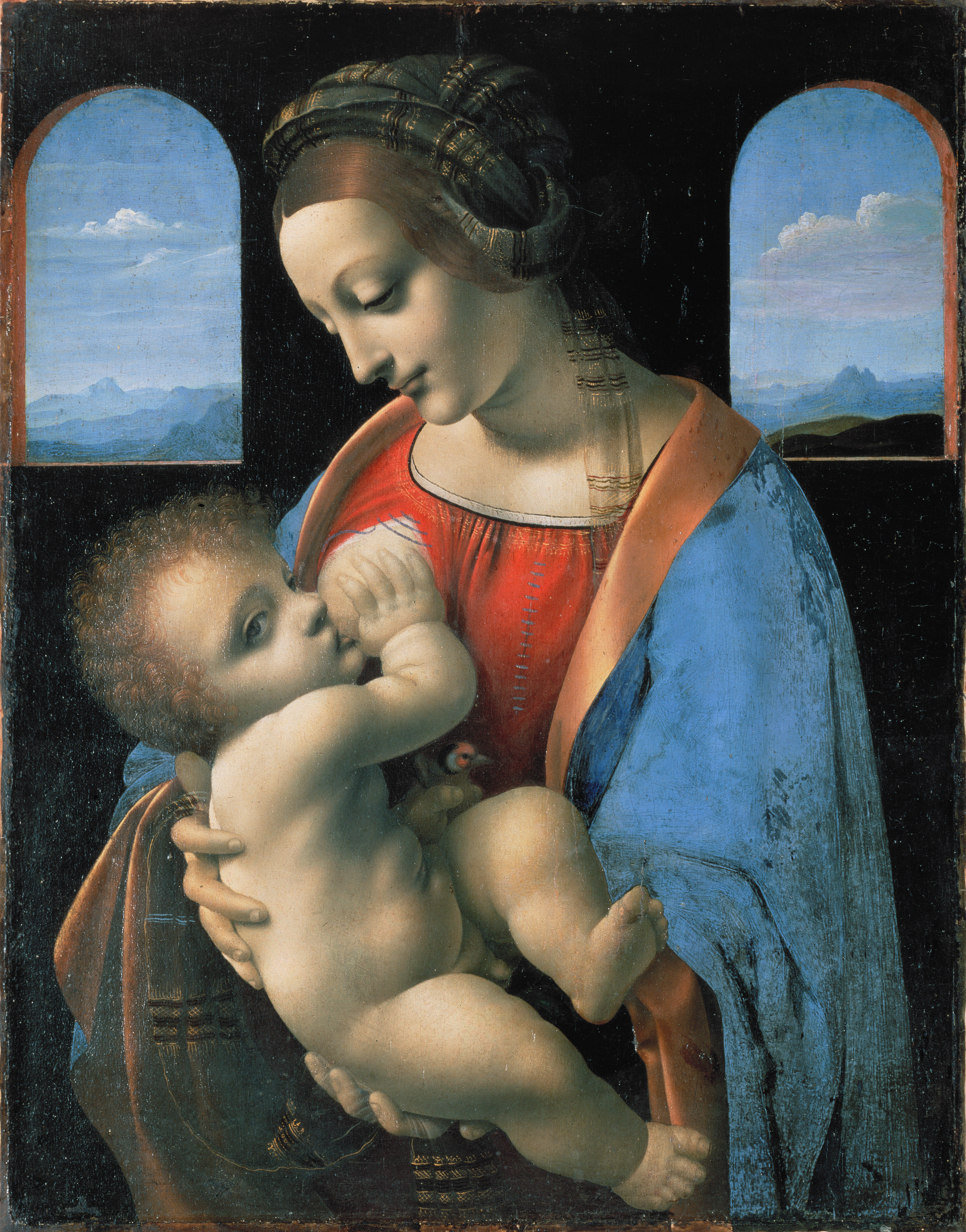
Early Renaissance: Madonna Litta by Leonardo da Vinci (c. 1490)

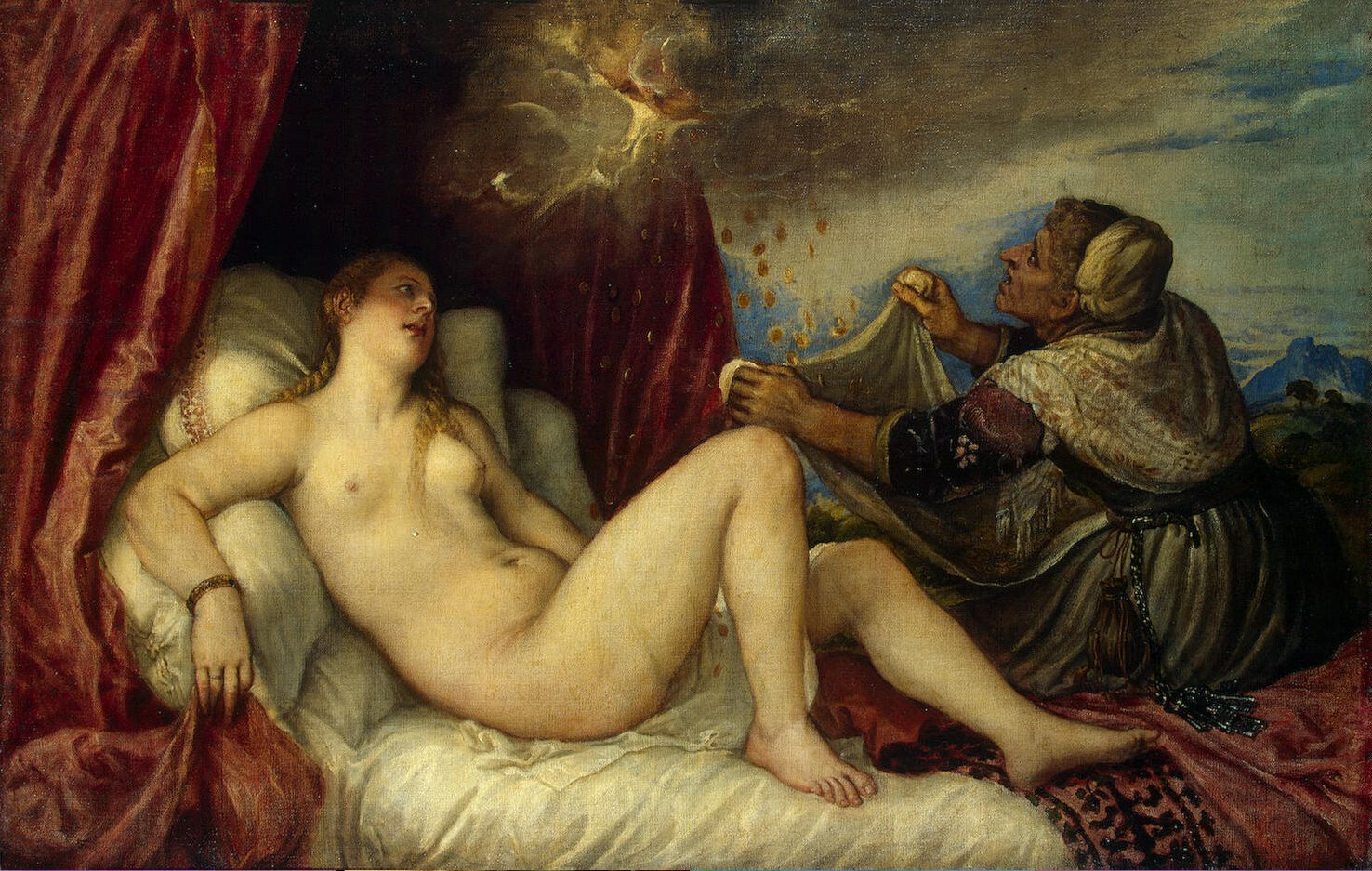
High Renaissance: Danaë by Titian (1553–1554)

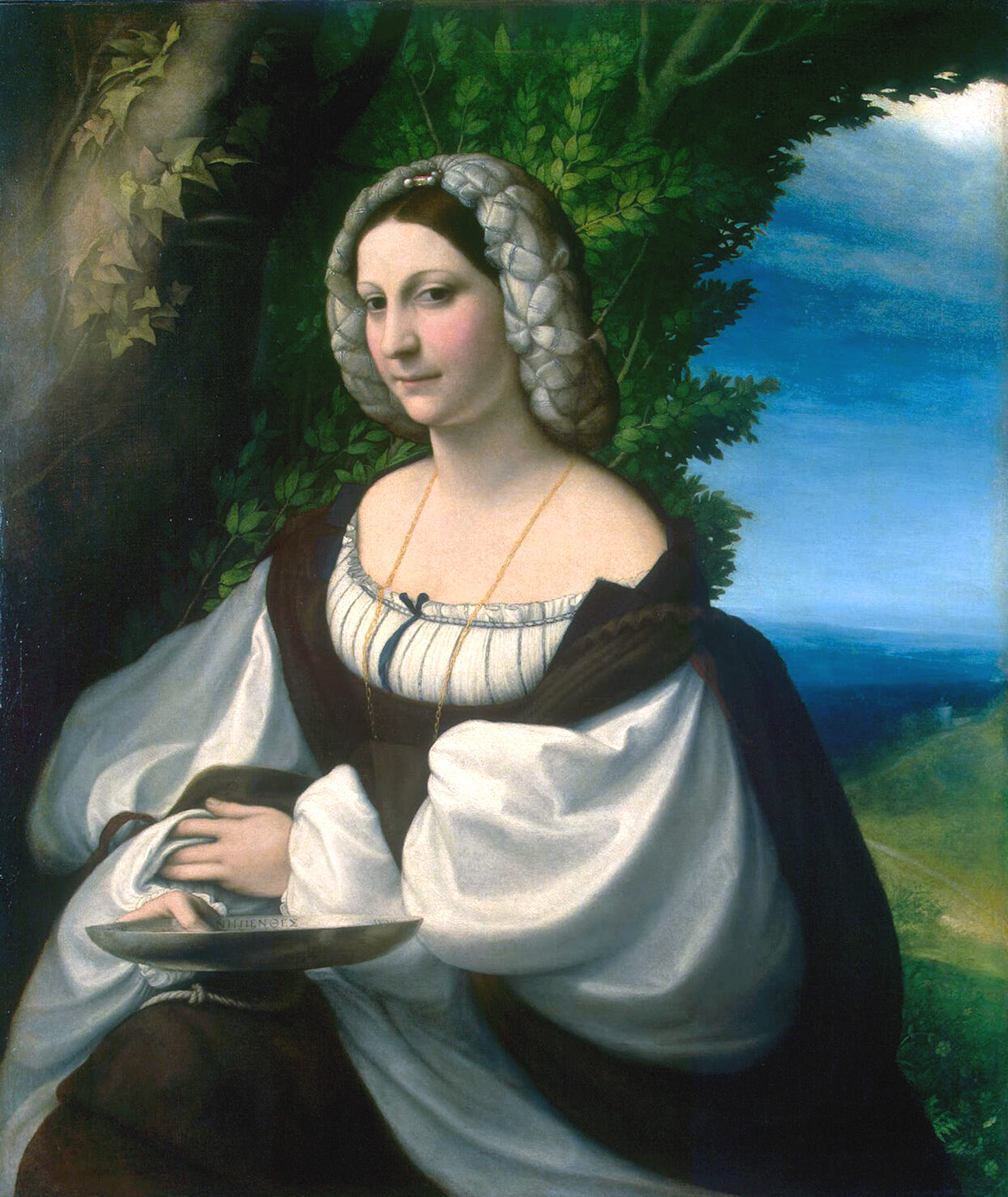
High Renaissance: Portrait of a Lady by Correggio (c. 1517–c. 1520)

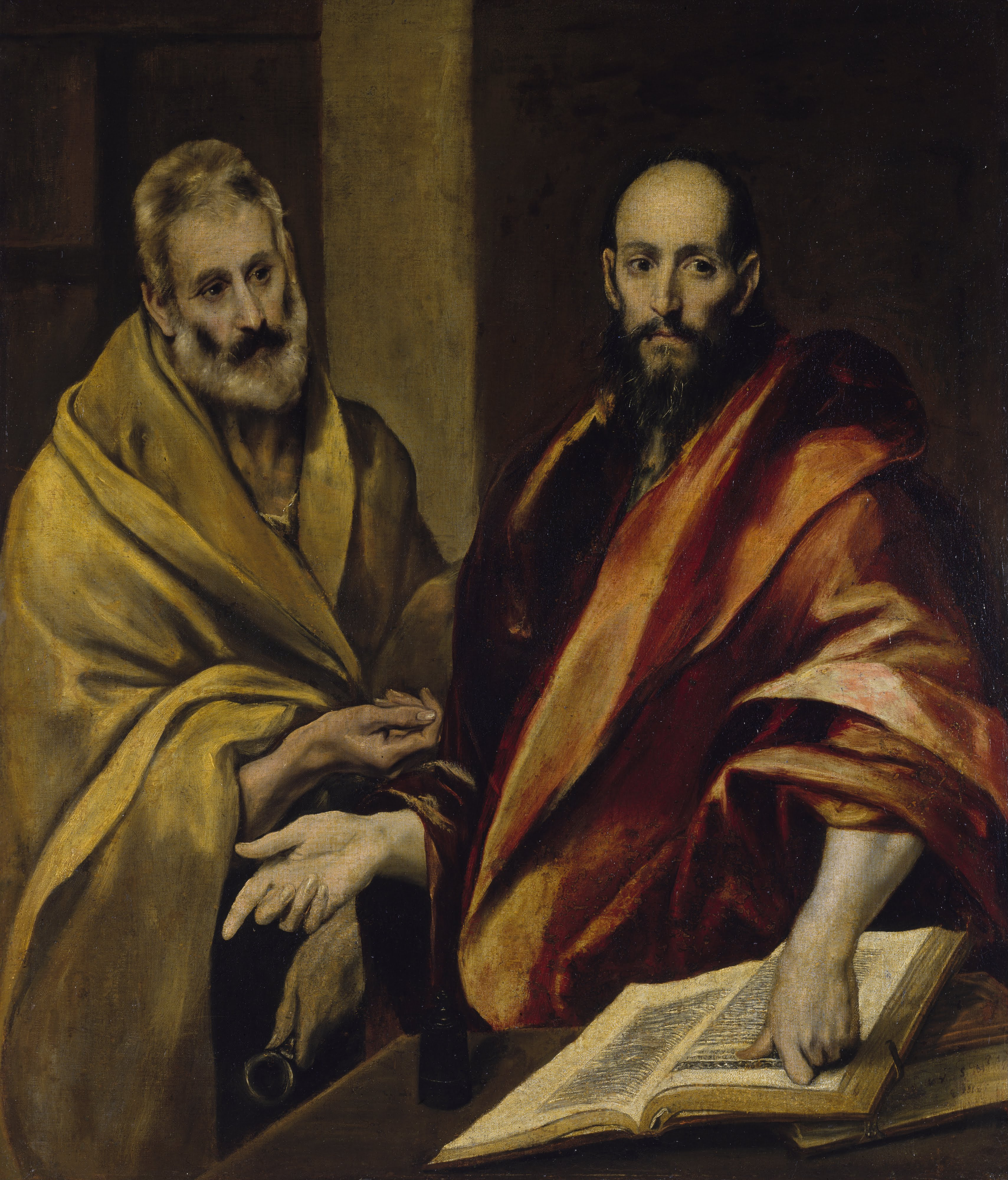
Mannerism: Saint Peter and Saint Paul by El Greco (1592)

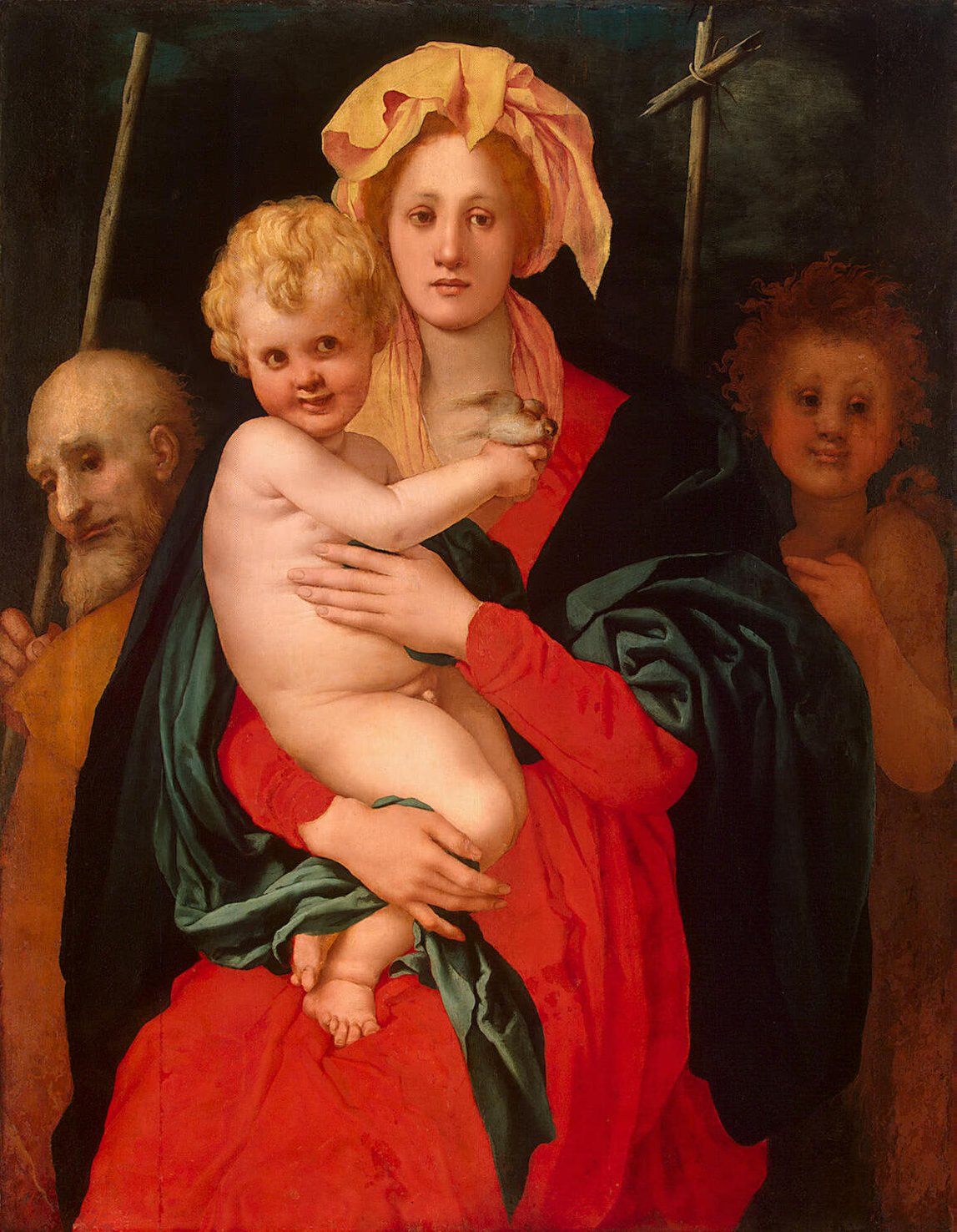
Mannerism: Holy Family with the Infant Saint John the Baptist by Pontormo (c. 1522–1523)

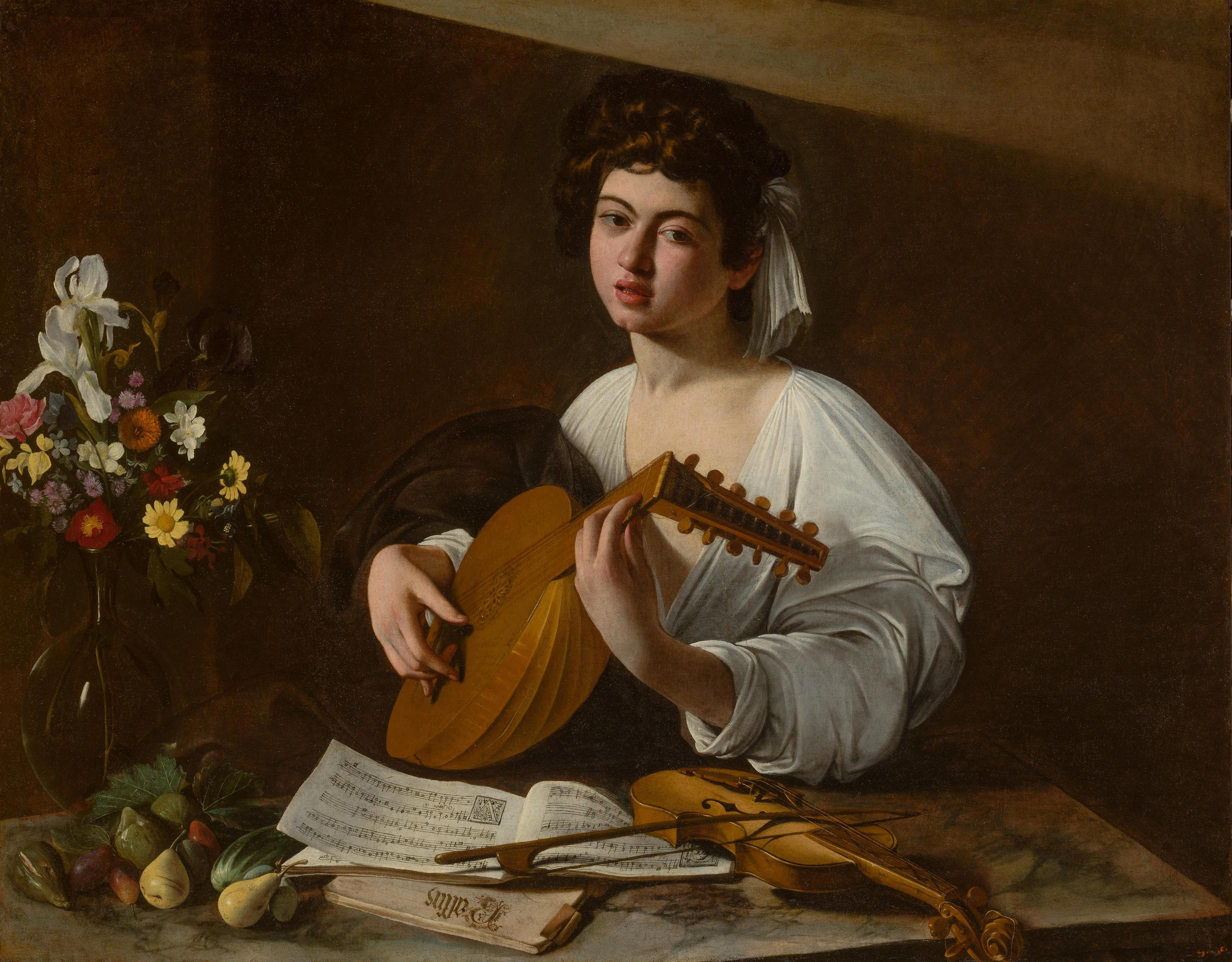
Italian Baroque: The Lute Player by Caravaggio (1596)

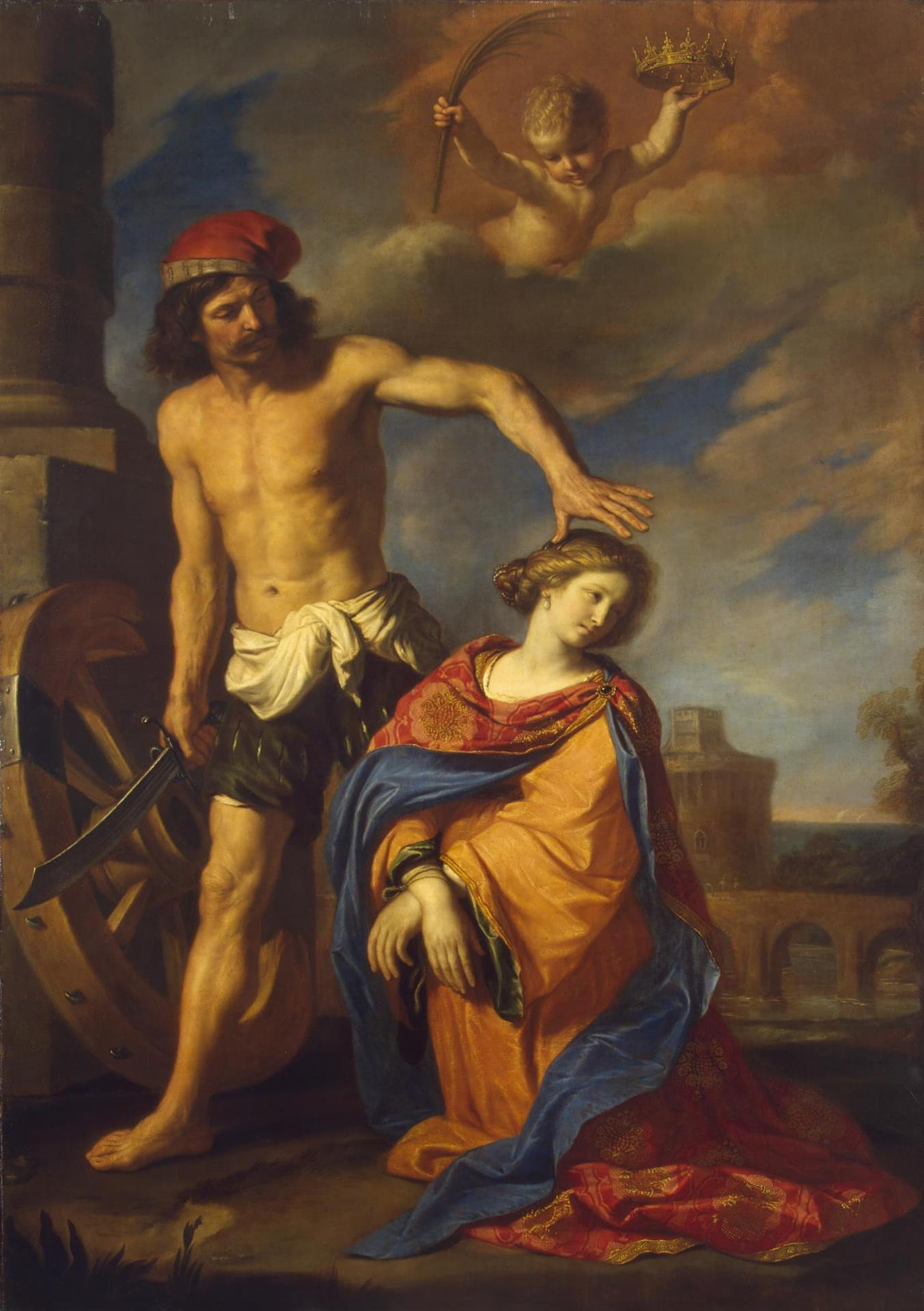
Italian Baroque: The Martyrdom of Saint Catherine by Guercino (1653)

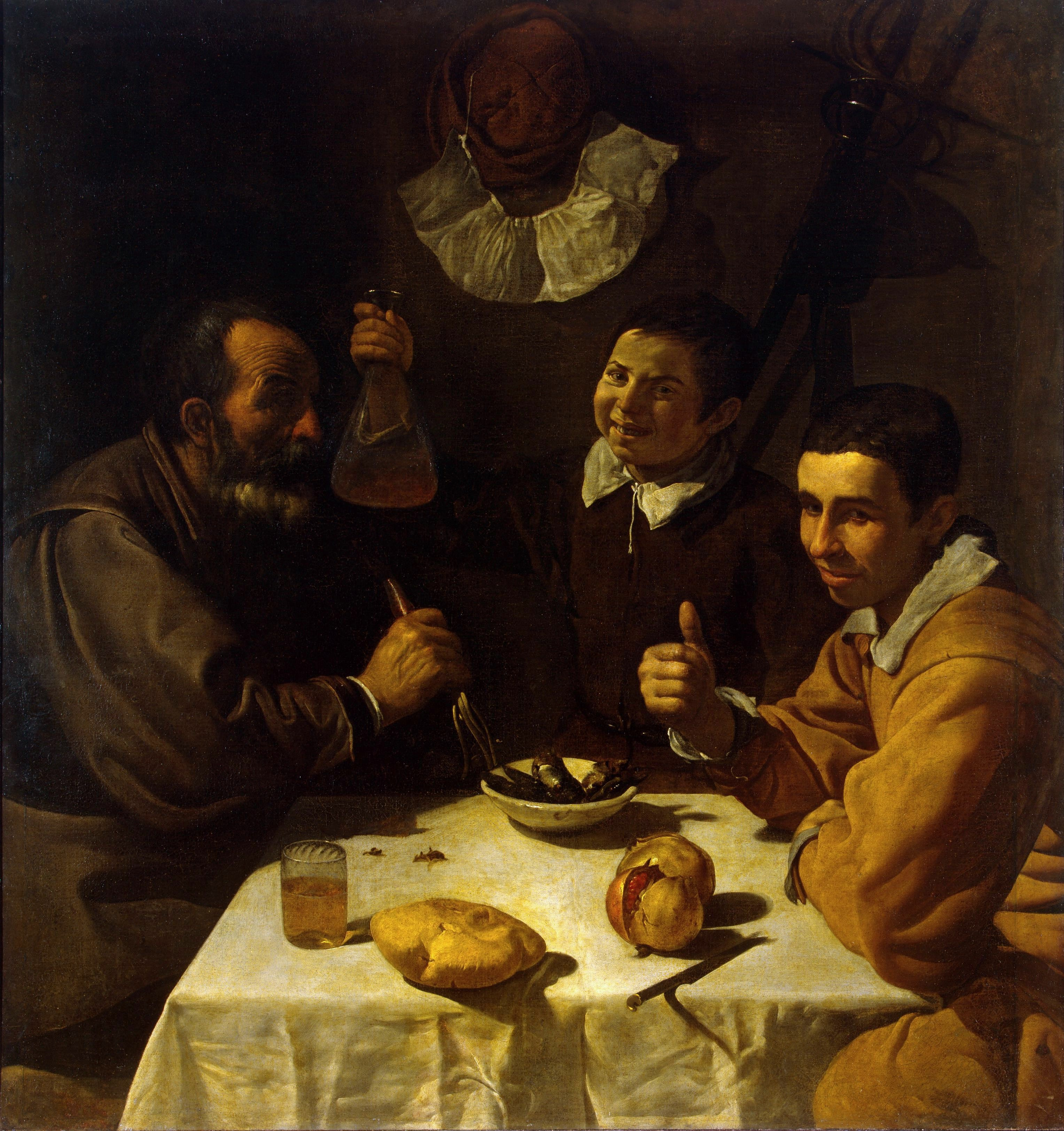
Spanish Baroque: The Lunch by Diego Velázquez (1617)

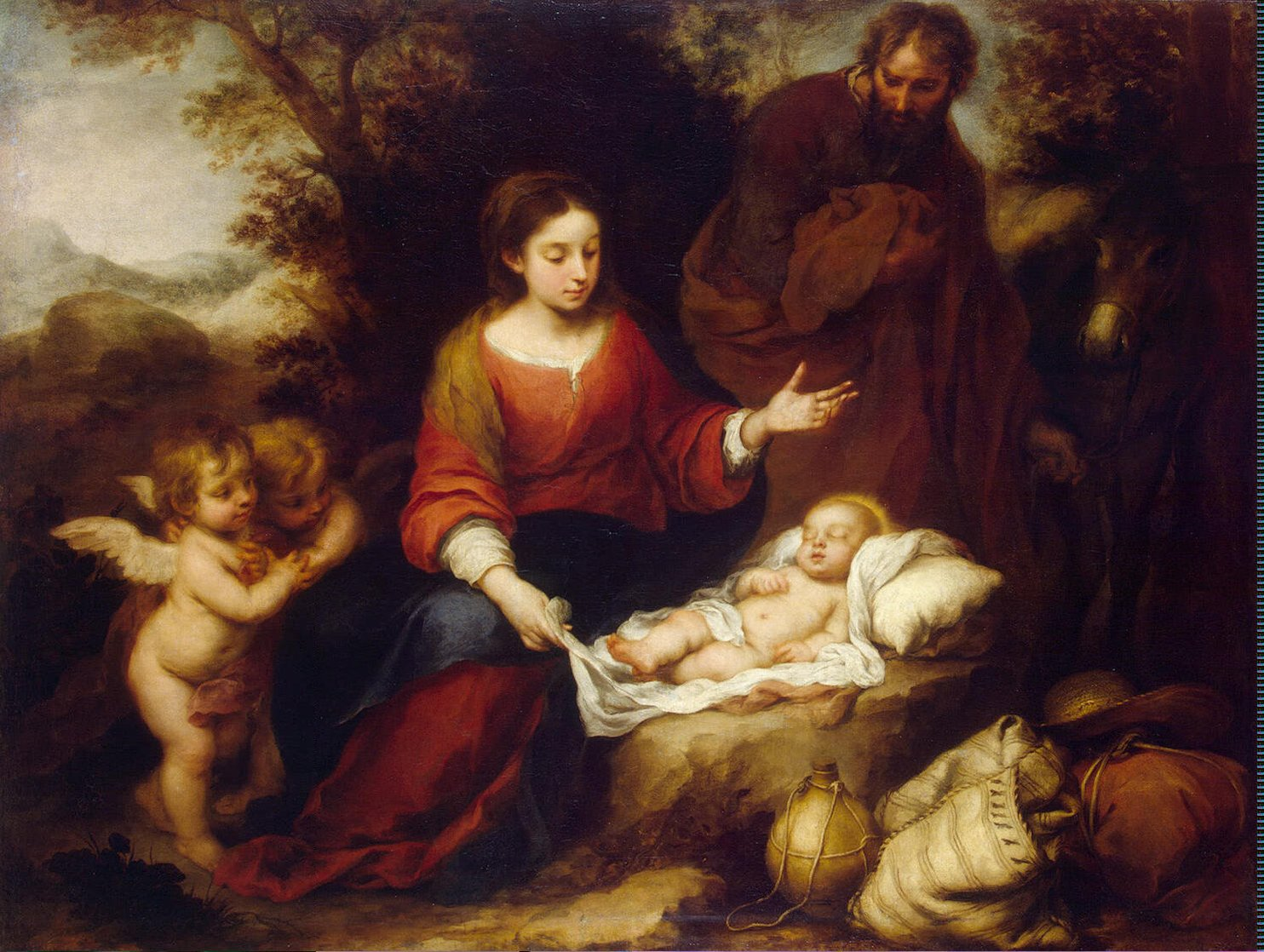
Spanish Baroque: Rest on the Flight into Egypt by Bartolomé Esteban Murillo (c. 1665)

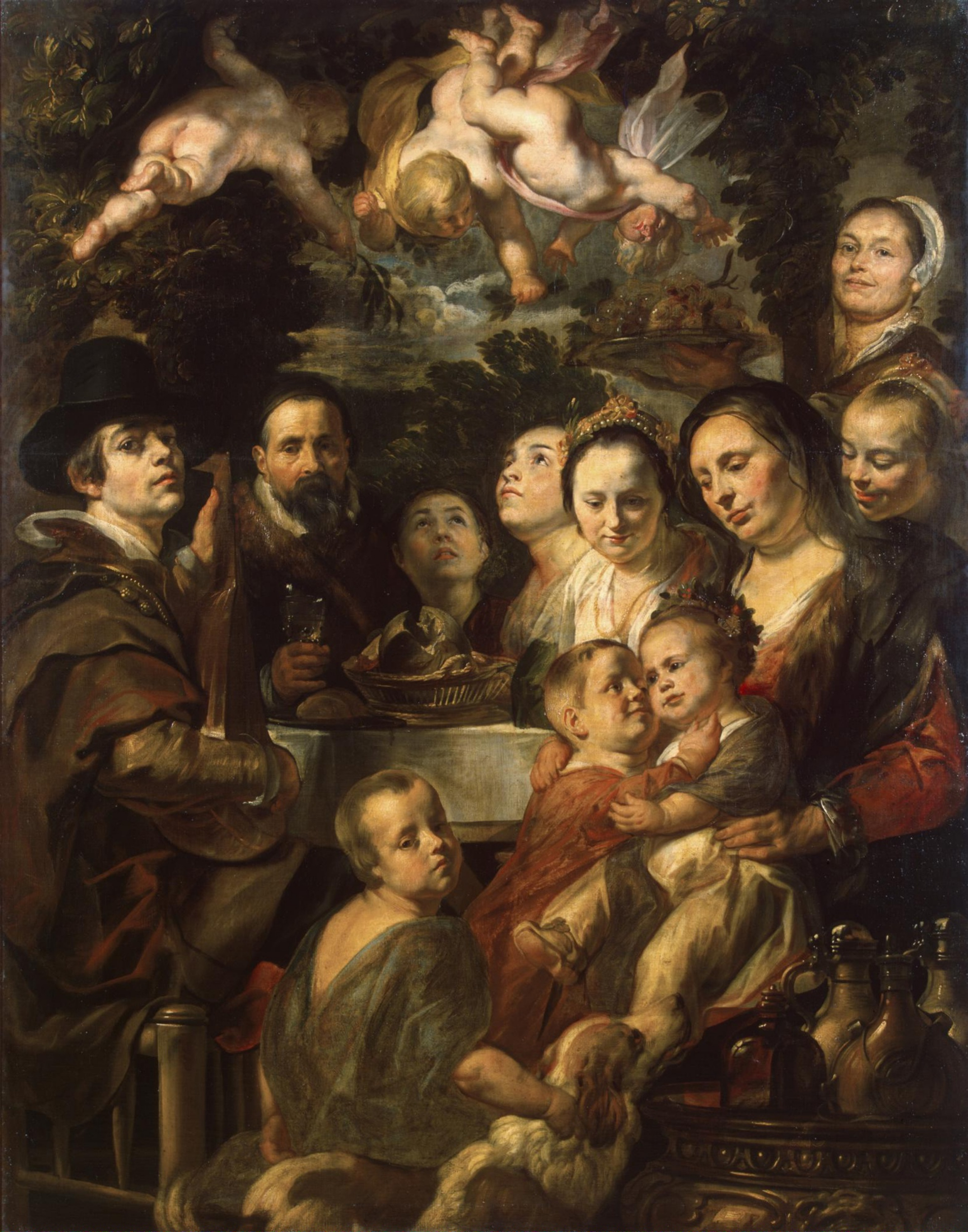
Flemish Baroque: Portrait of the Artist with his Family by Jacob Jordaens (1615)

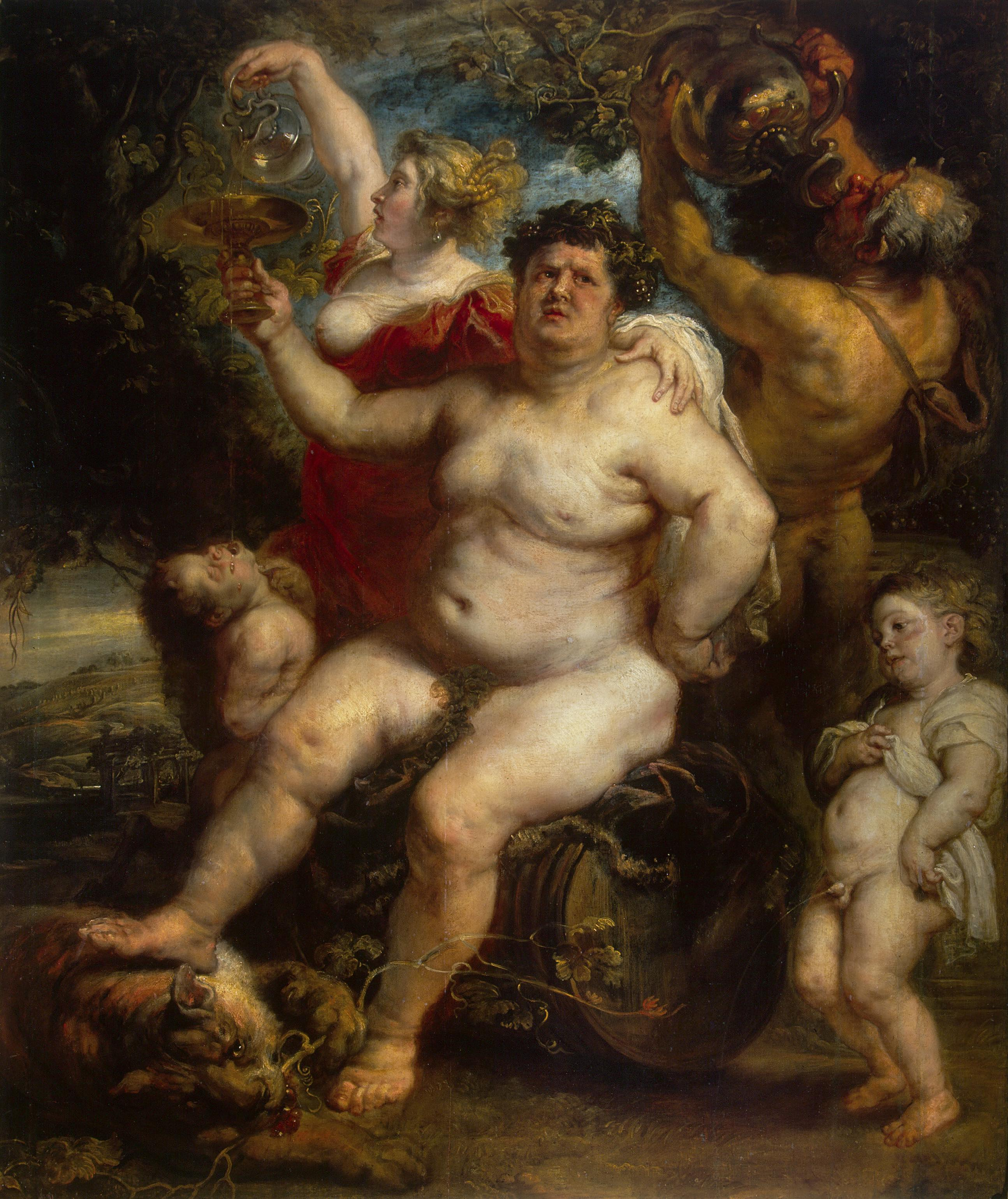
Flemish Baroque: Bacchus by Peter Paul Rubens (1638-1640)

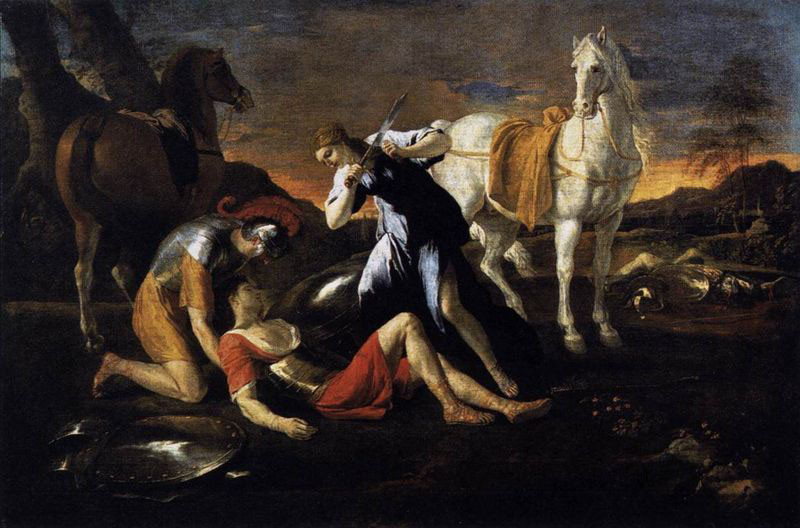
Classicism: Tancred and Herminia by Nicolas Poussin (1649)

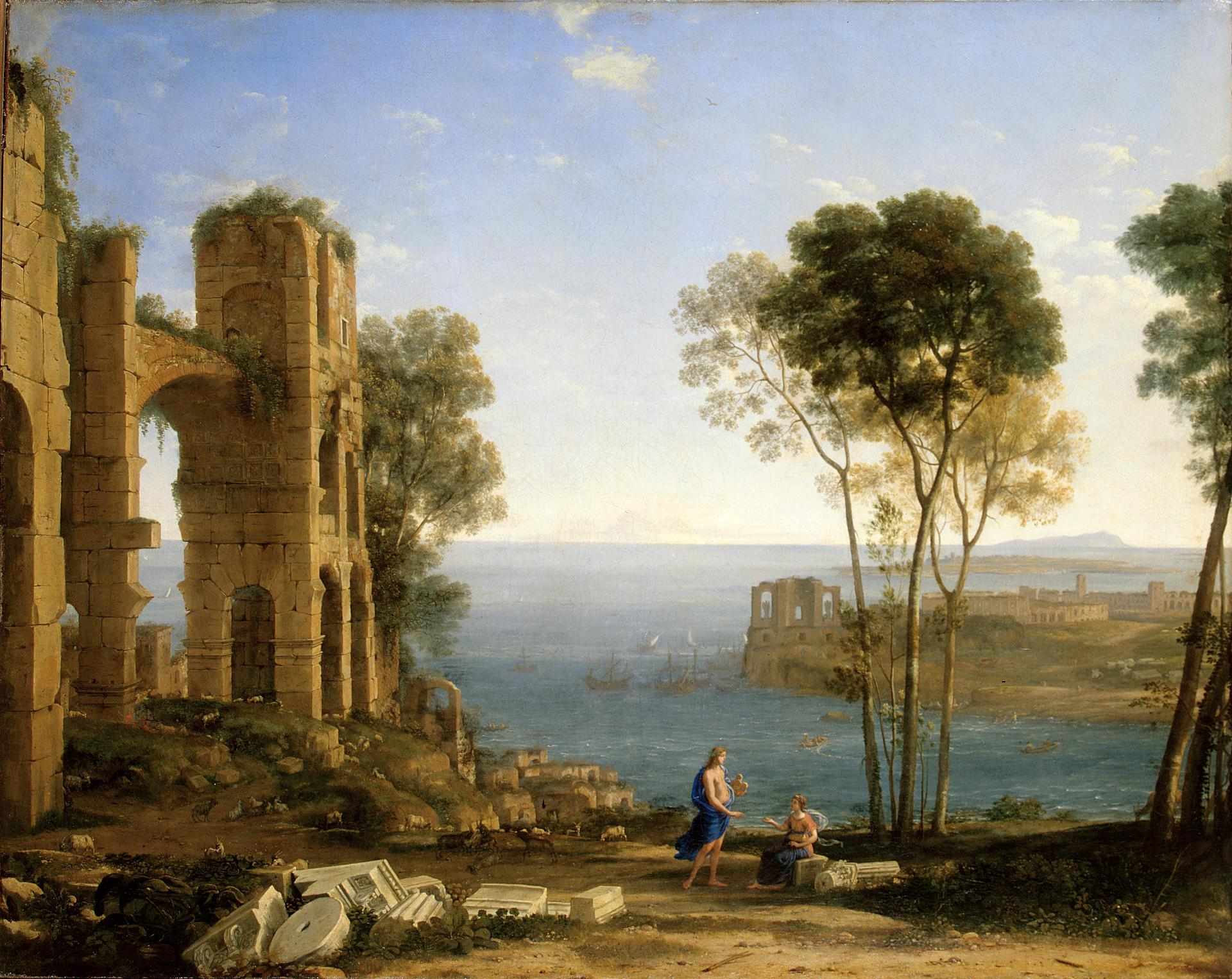
Classicism: Coast View with Apollo and the Cumaean Sibyl by Claude Lorrain (between 1645 and 1649)

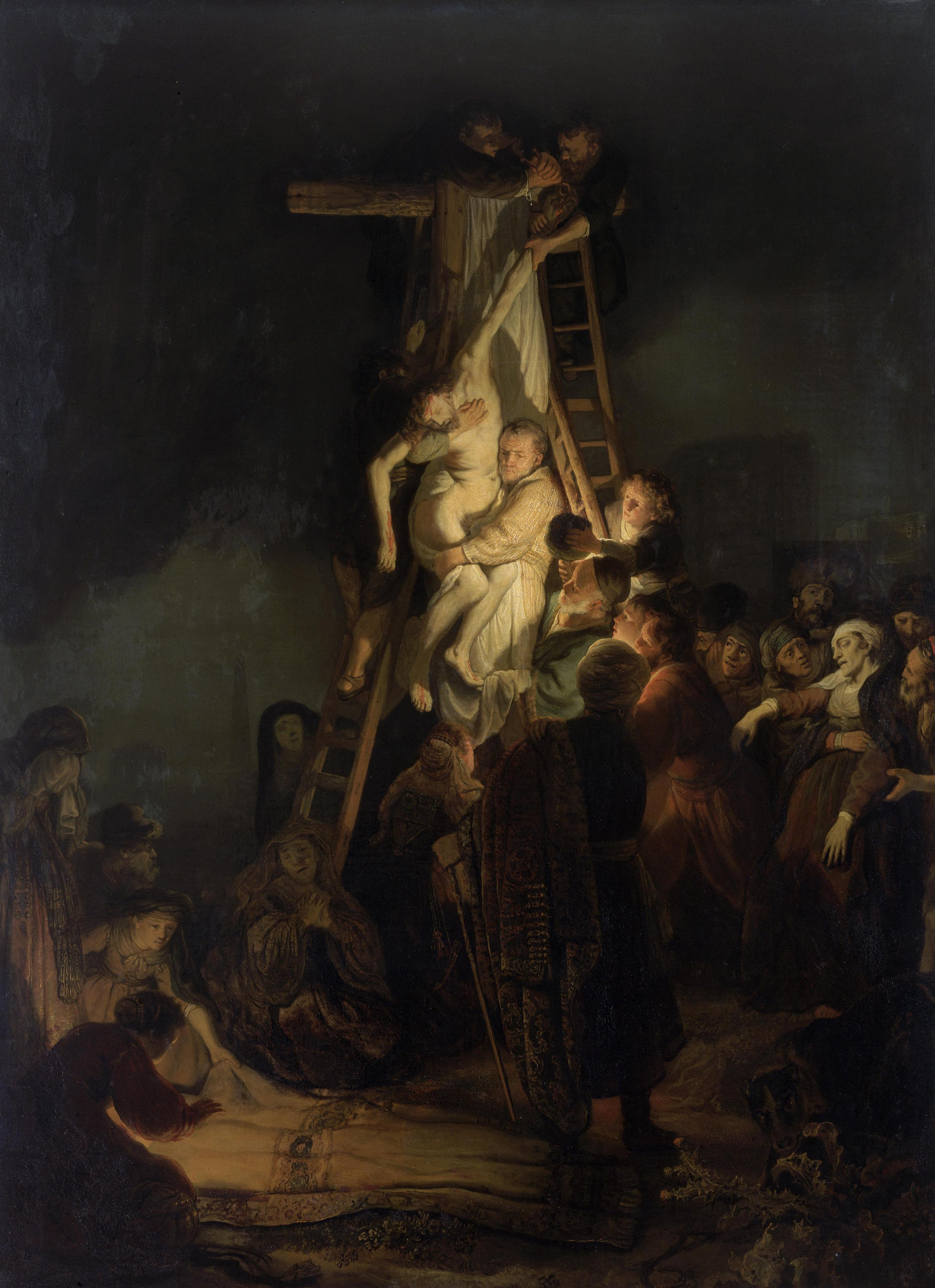
Dutch Baroque: The Descent from the Cross by Rembrandt (1634)

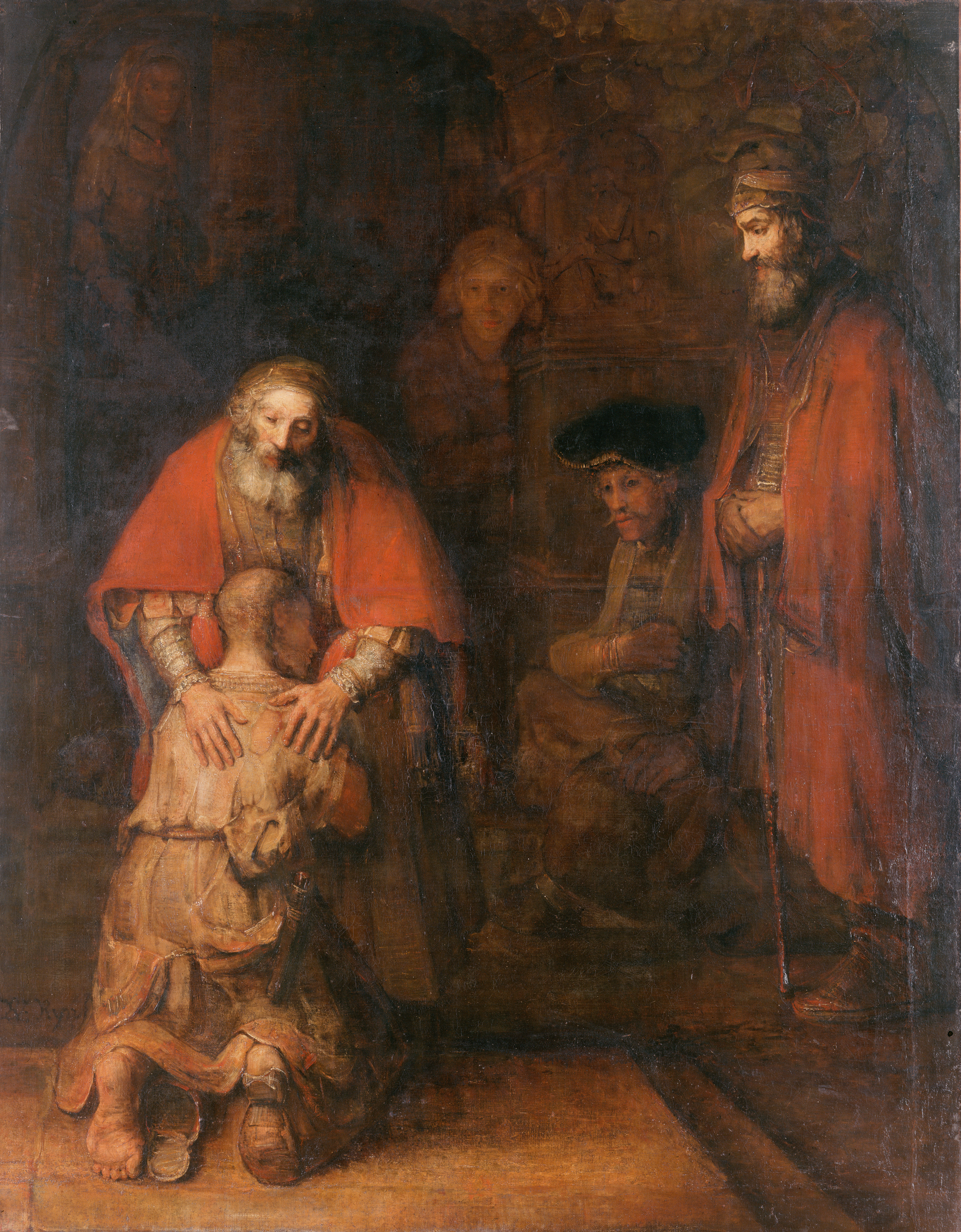
Dutch Baroque: The Return of the Prodigal Son by Rembrandt (1661–1669)

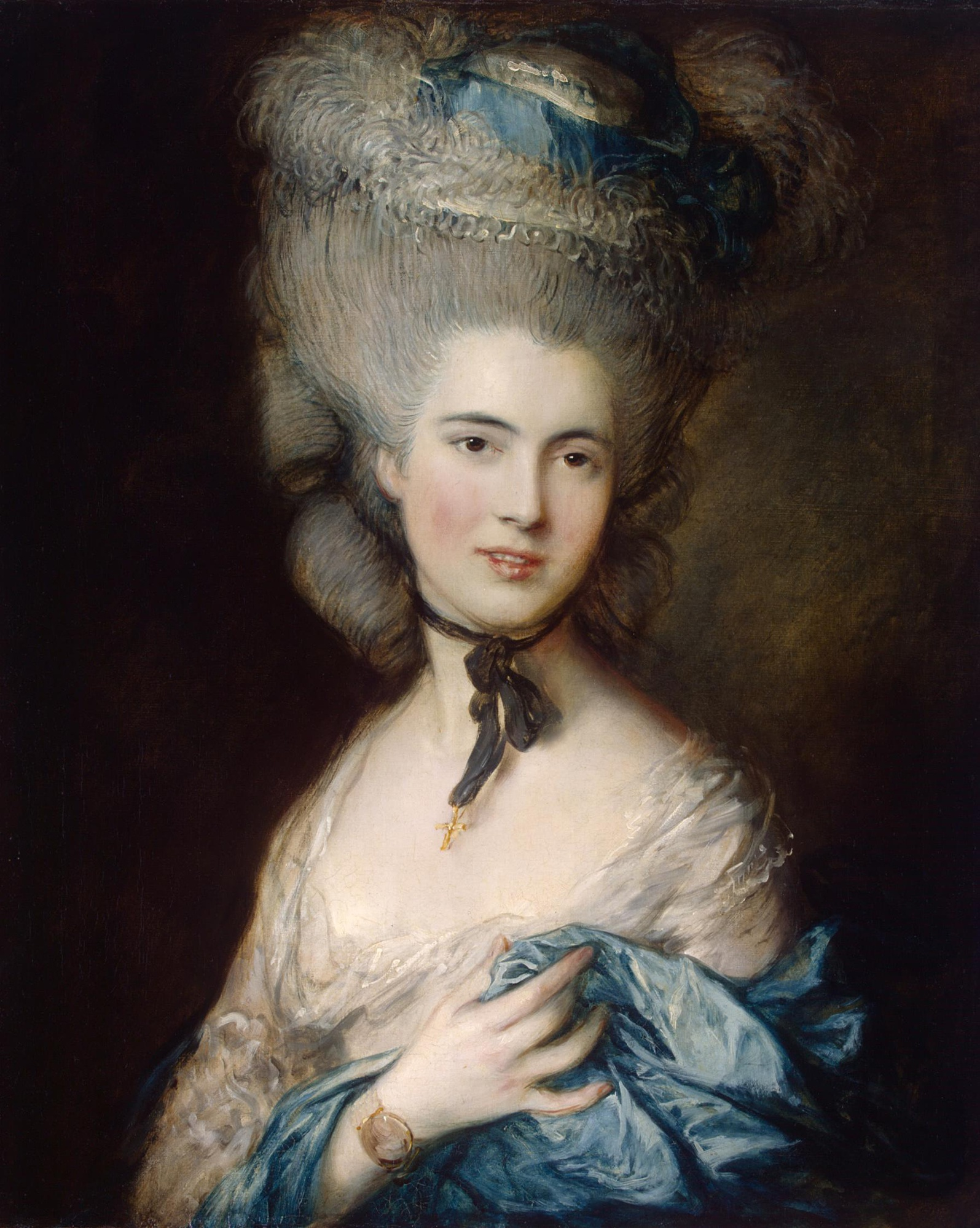
English: Woman in Blue by Thomas Gainsborough (c. 1770s)

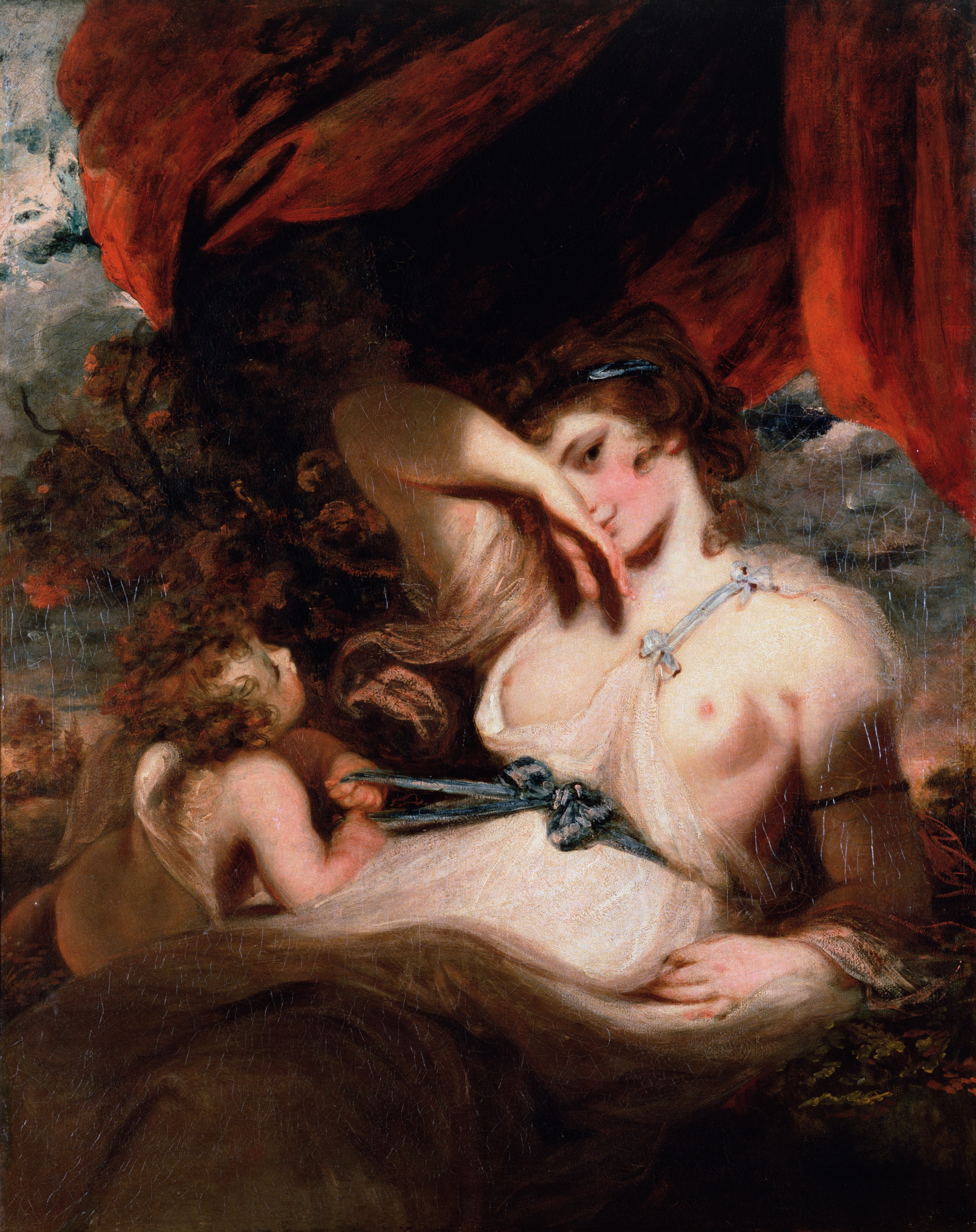
English: Cupid Untying the Zone of Venus by Joshua Reynolds (1788)

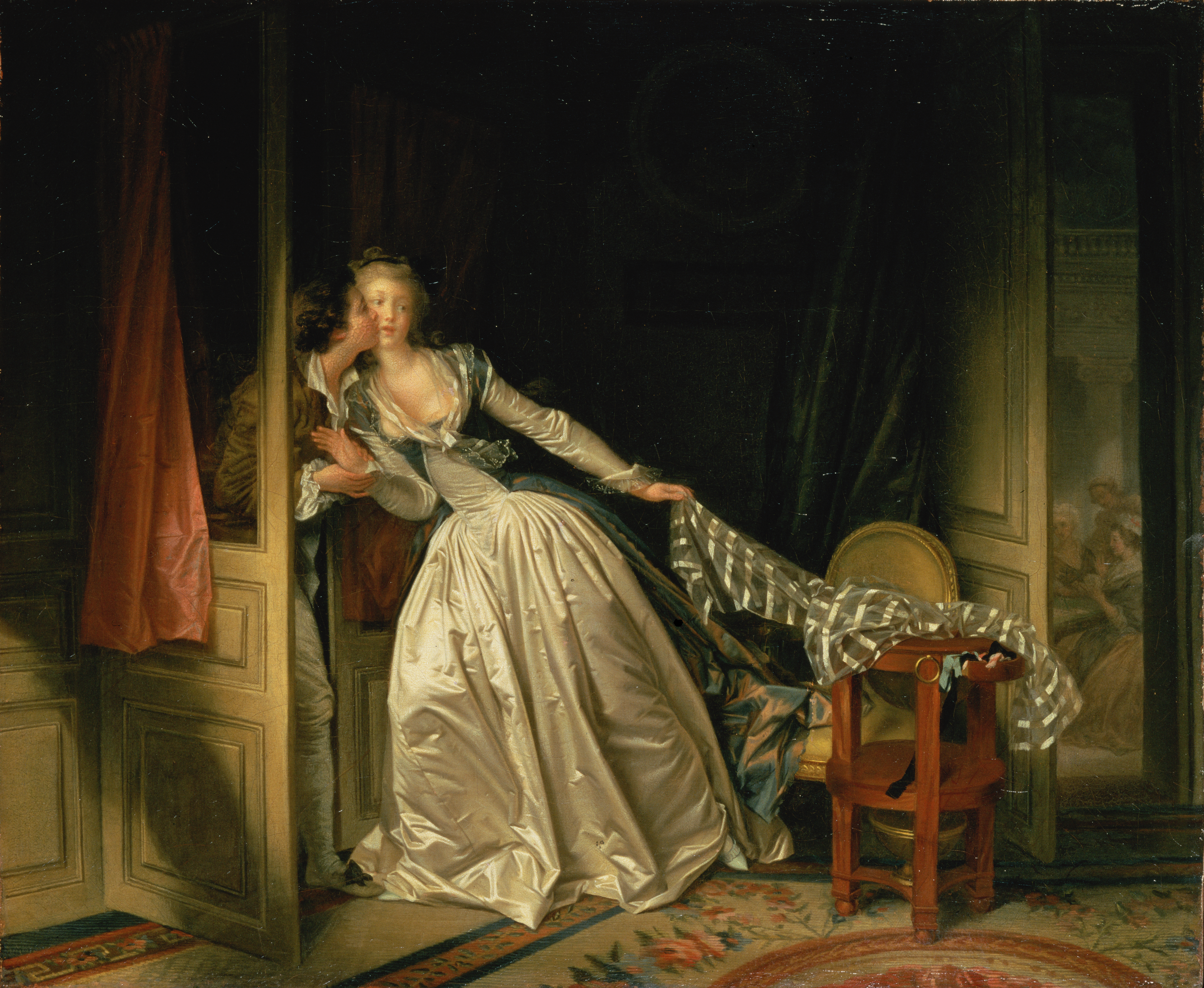
Rococo: The Stolen Kiss by Jean-Honoré Fragonard (c. 1780)

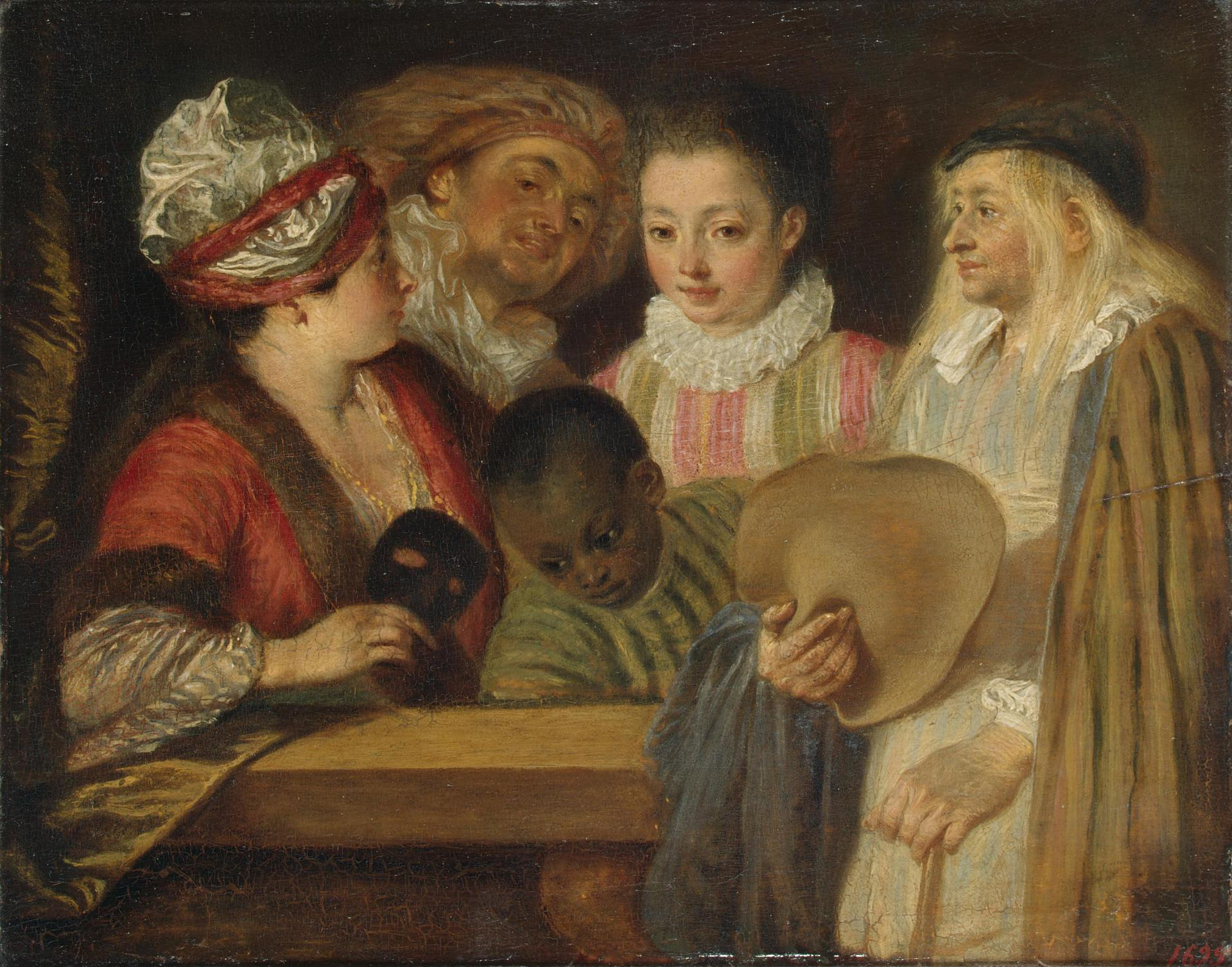
Rococo: Actors of the Comédie-Française by Antoine Watteau (c. 1711–1718)

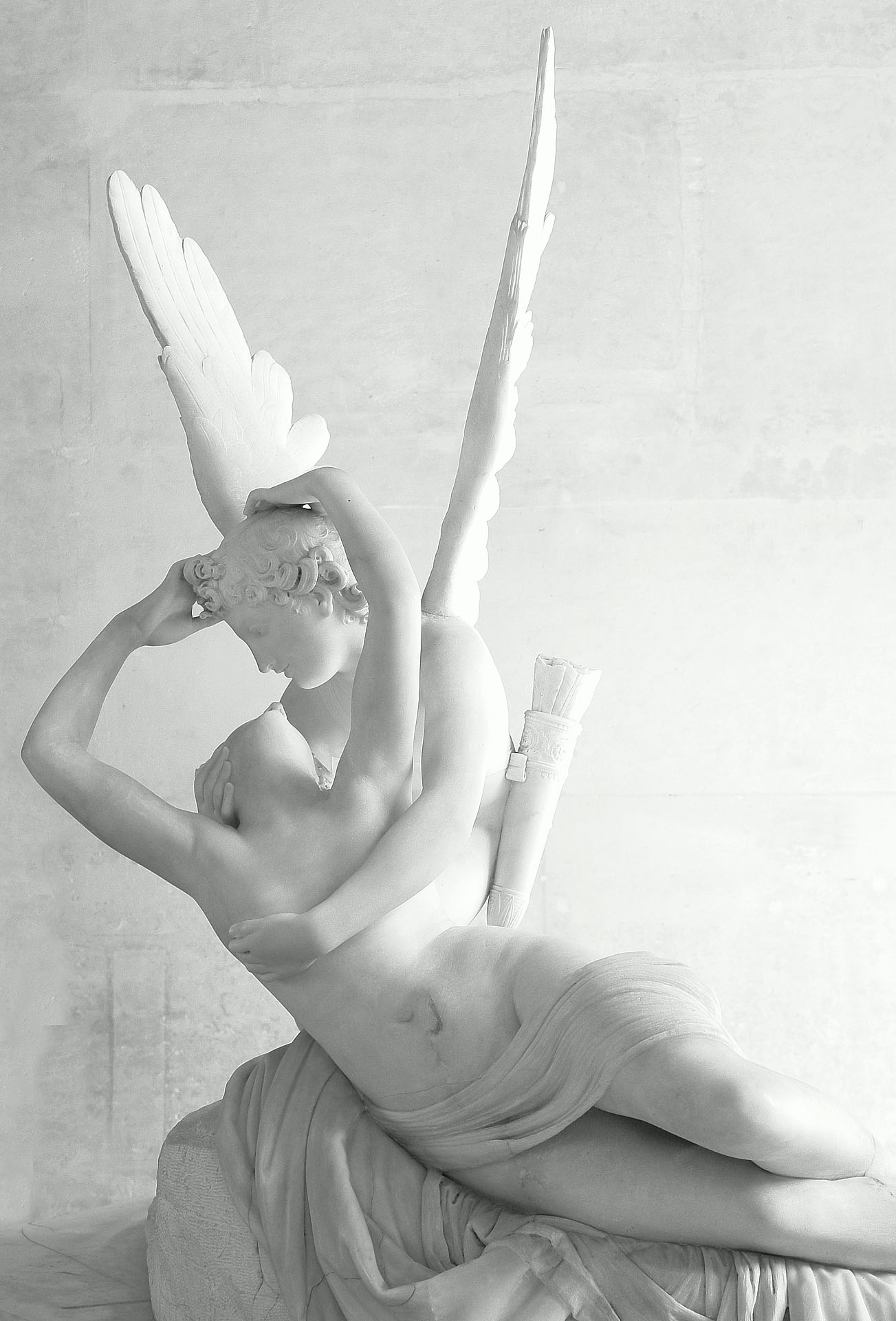
Neoclassicism: Psyche Revived by Cupid's Kiss by Antonio Canova (1800–1803)

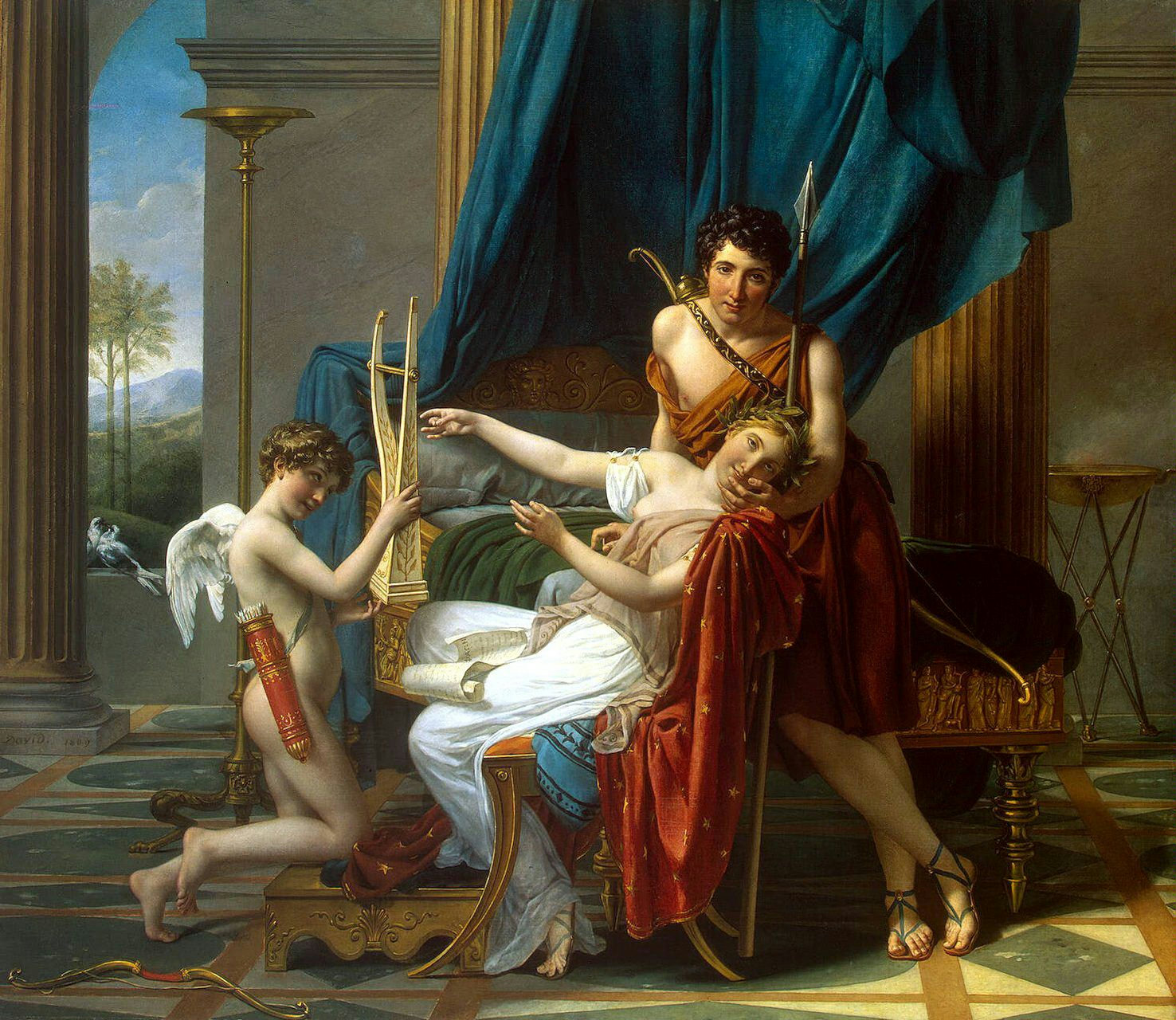
Neoclassicism: Sappho and Phaon by Jacques-Louis David (1809)

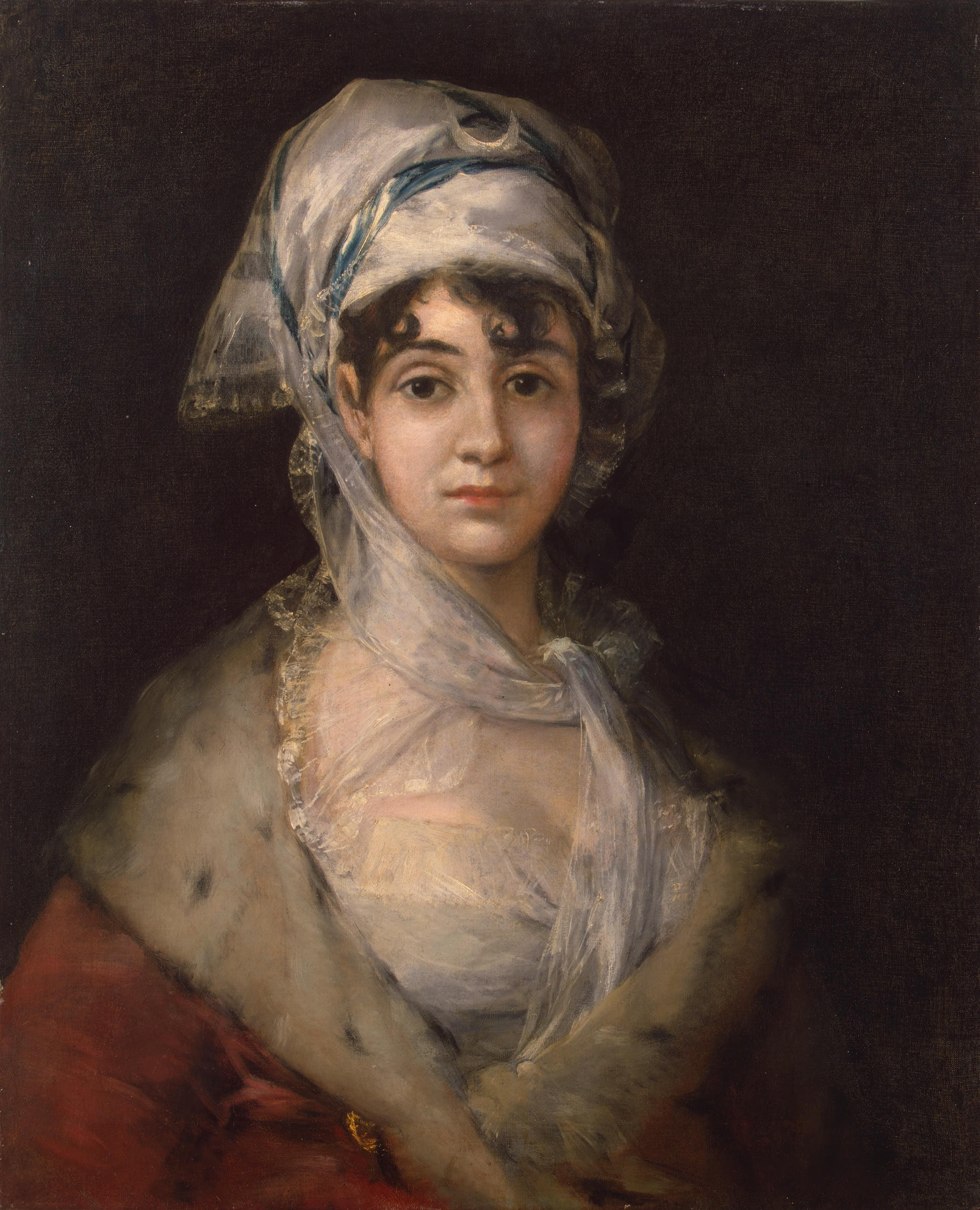
Romanticism: Portrait of Antonia Zarate by Francisco Goya (1810)

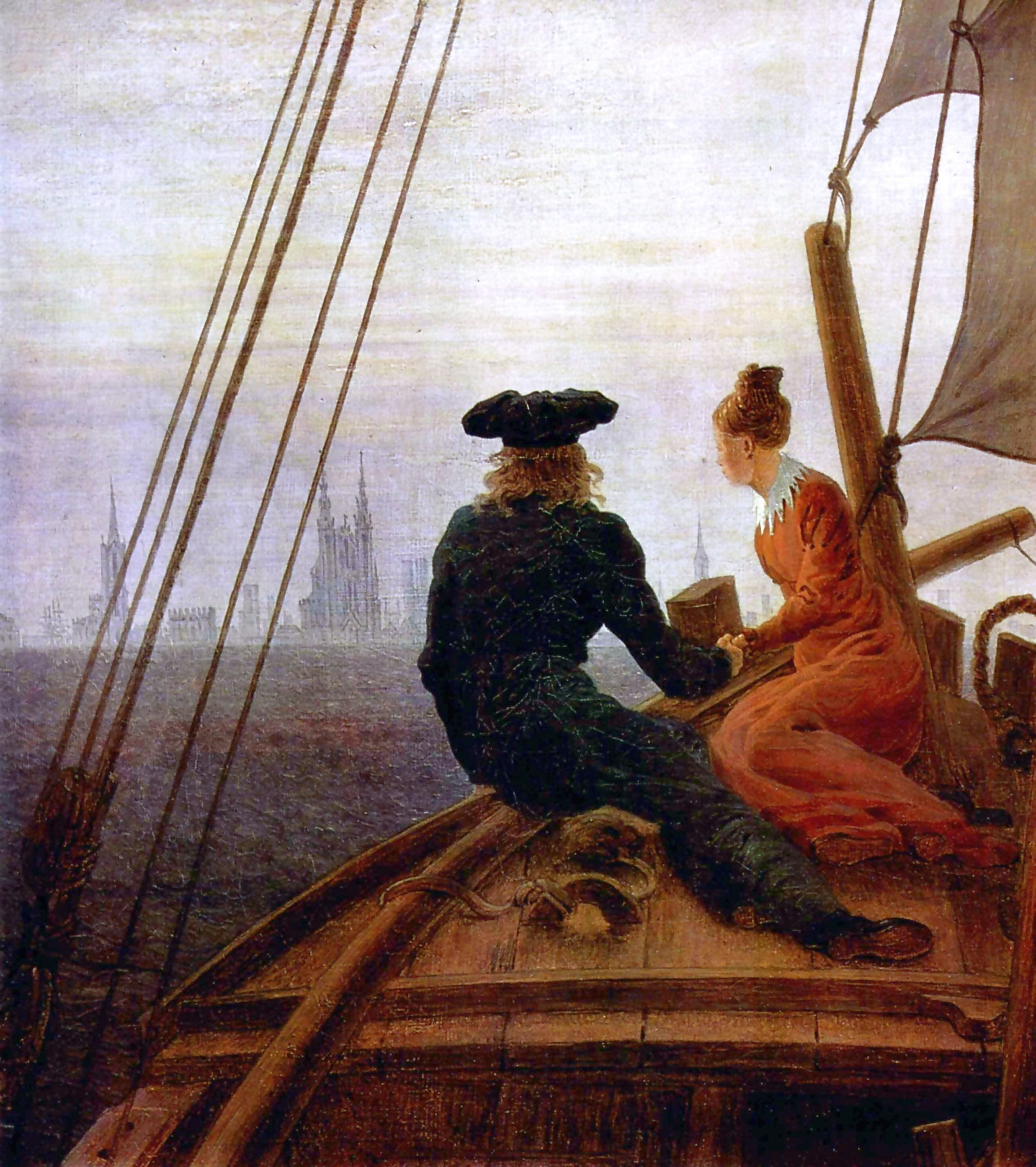
Romanticism: On the Sailing Boat by Caspar David Friedrich (1819)

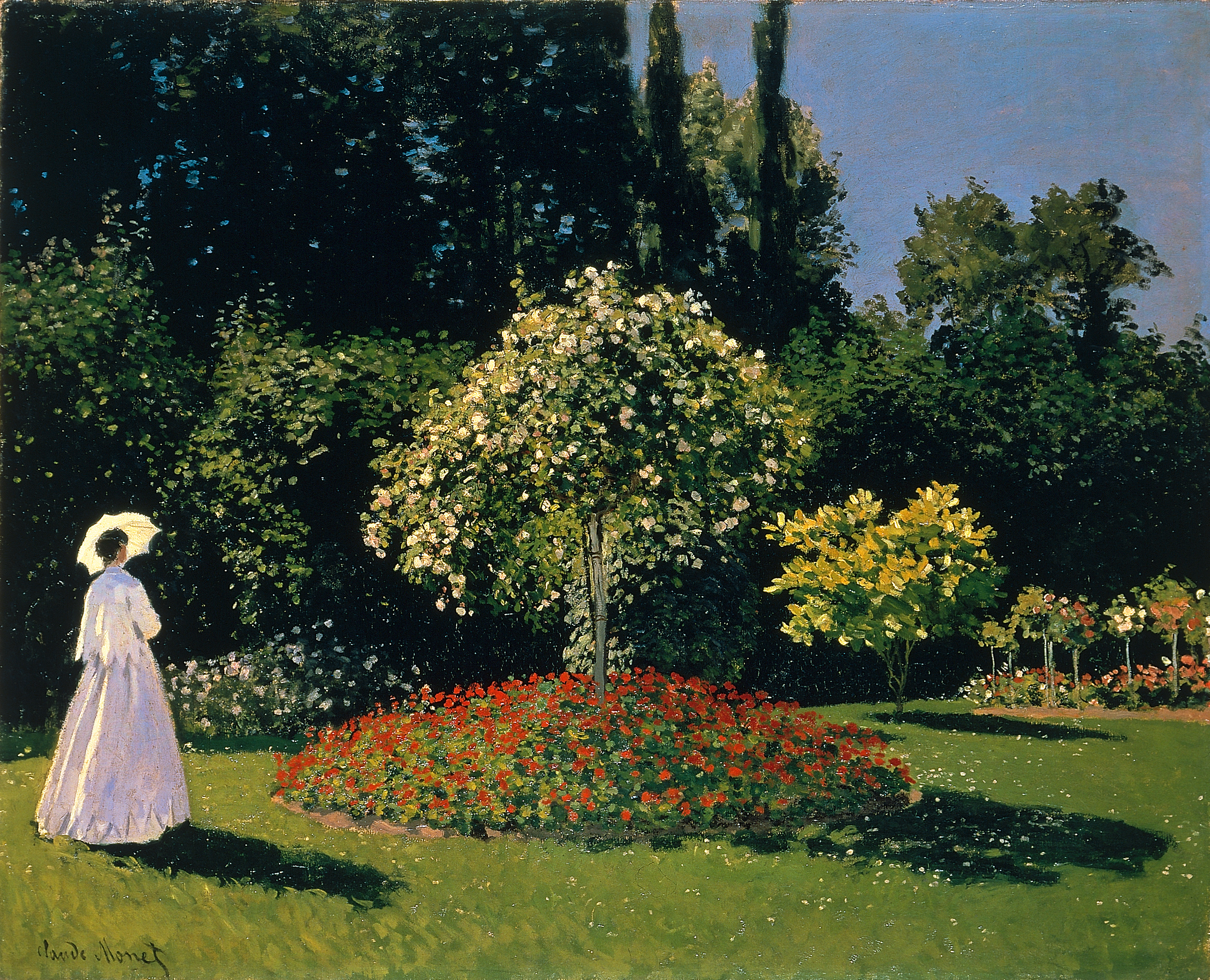
Impressionism: Woman in the Garden by Claude Monet (1867)

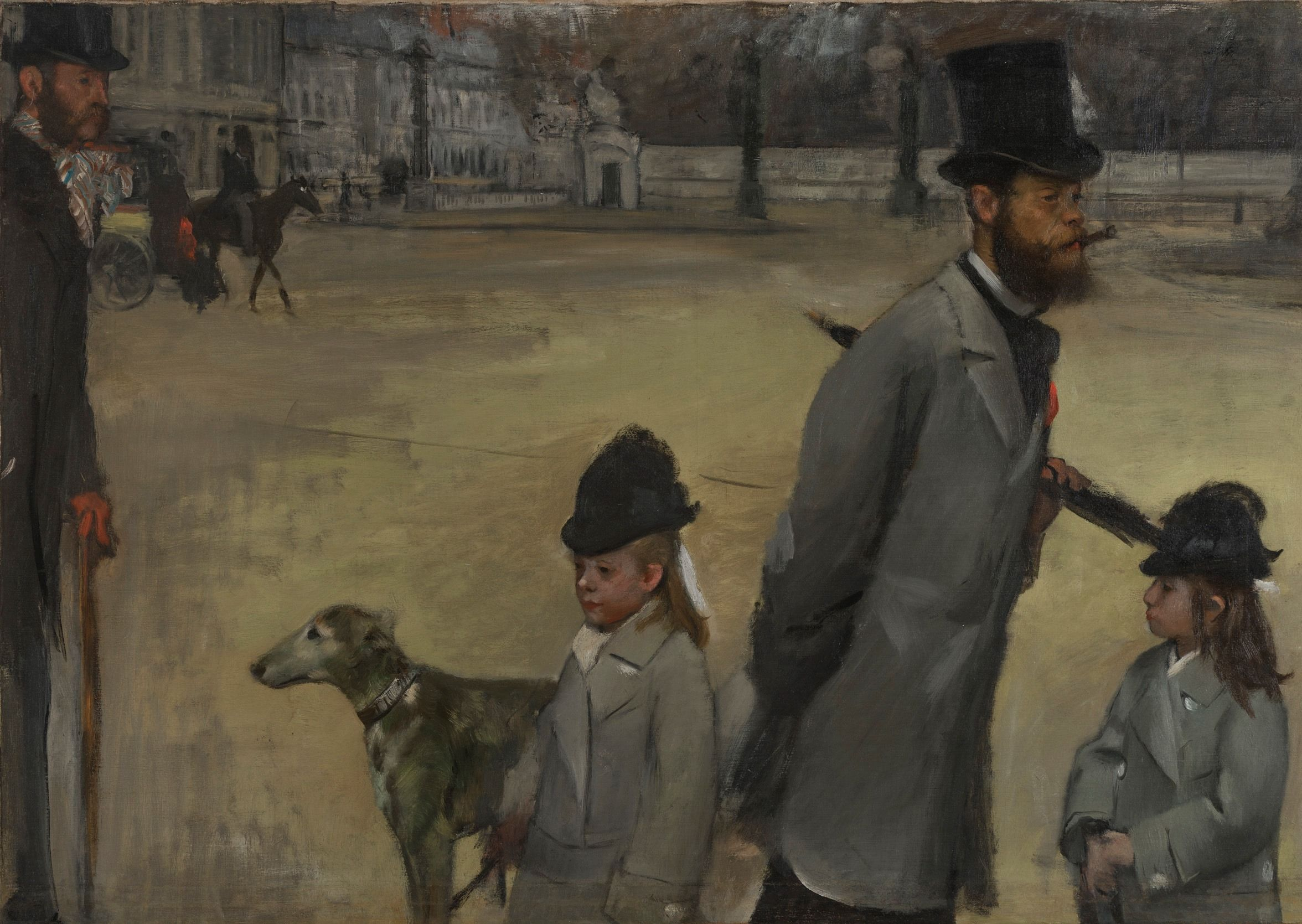
Impressionism: Place de la Concorde by Edgar Degas (1875)

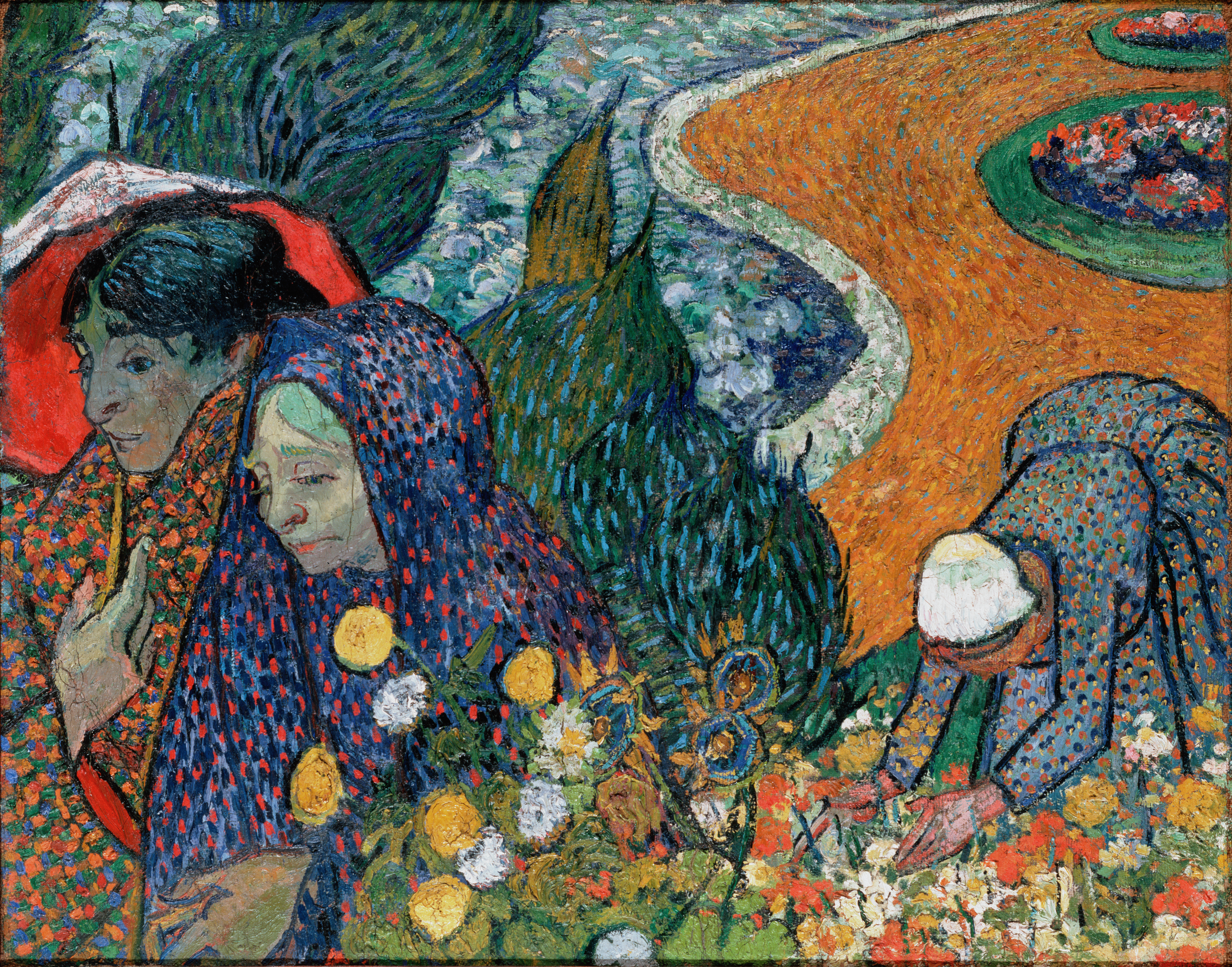
Post-Impressionism: Memory of the Garden at Etten (Ladies of Arles) by Vincent van Gogh (1888)

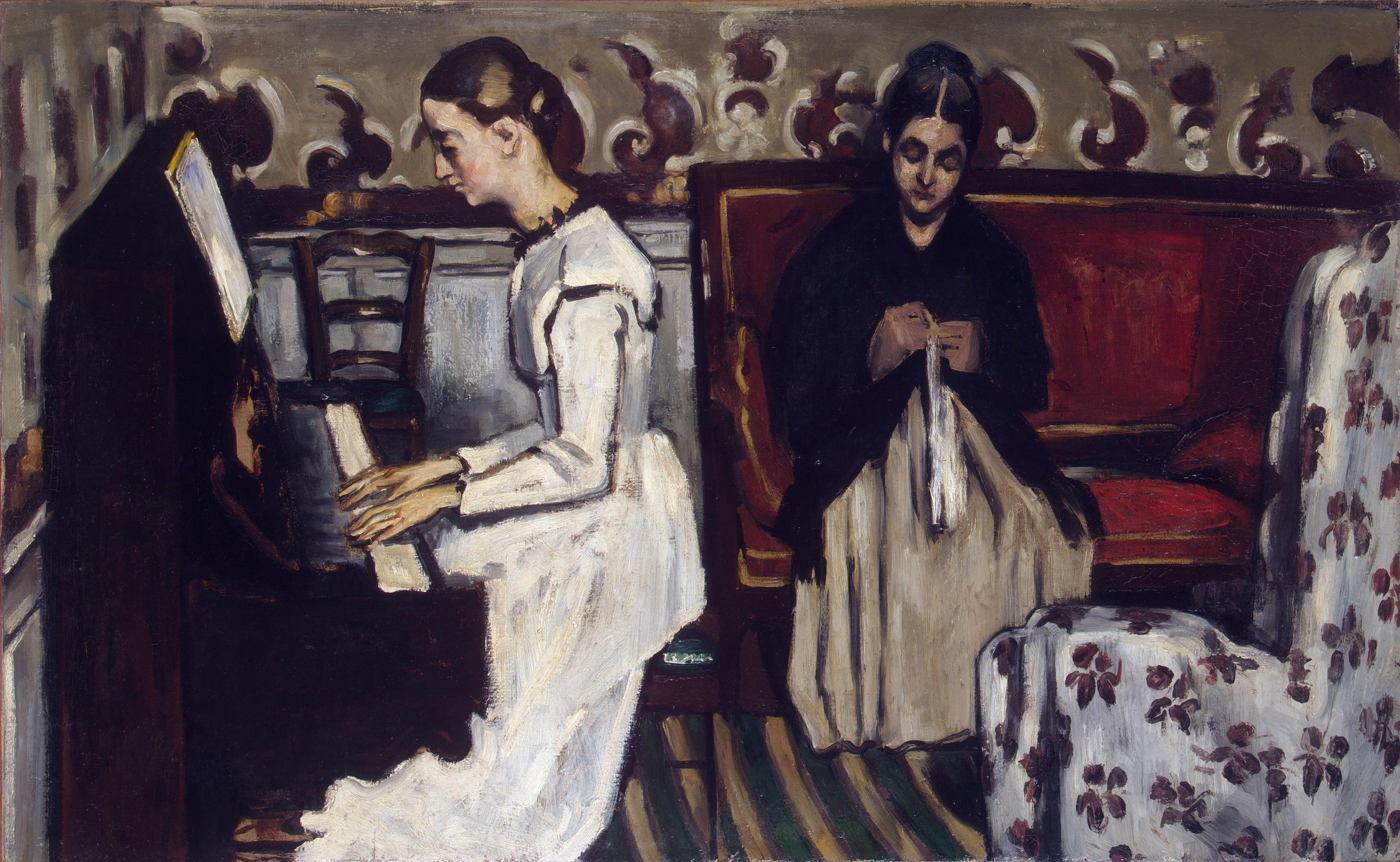
Post-Impressionism: The Overture to Tannhauser by Paul Cézanne (1868)

Picasso's Rose Period: Femme au café (Absinthe Drinker) by Pablo Picasso (1901–02)

Proto-Cubism: Dryad, by Pablo Picasso (1908)

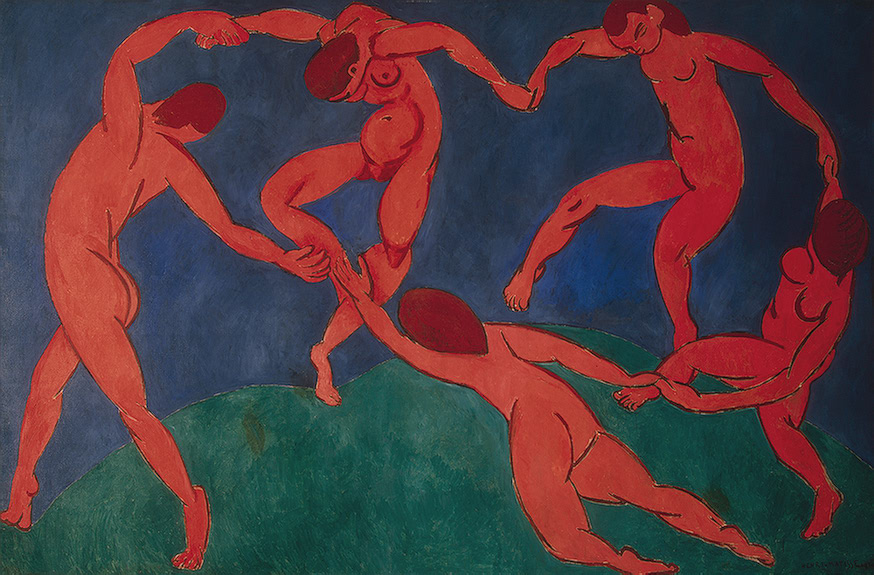
Fauvism: The Dance by Henri Matisse (1910)

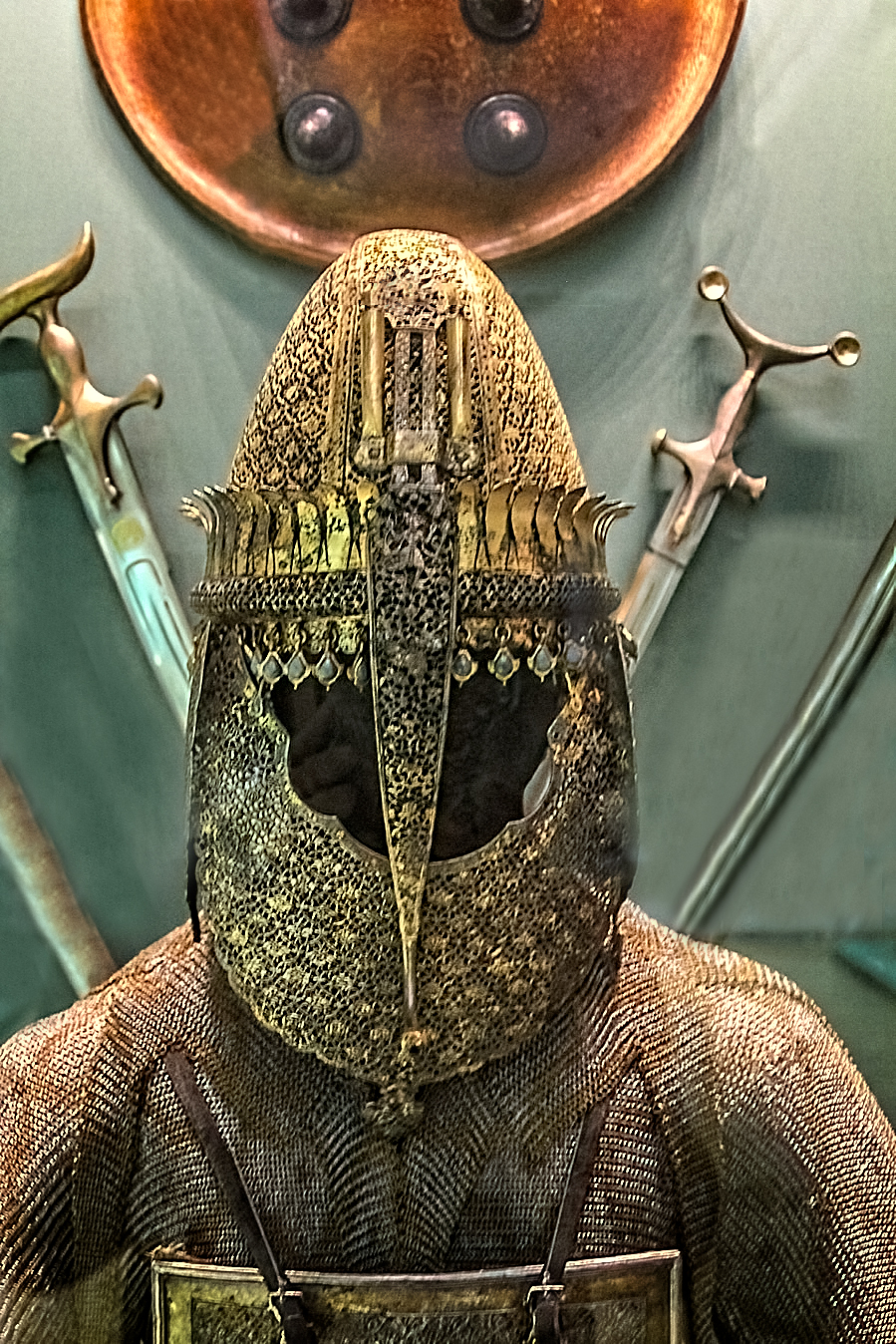
Maratha India: A Maratha Armour and Helmet

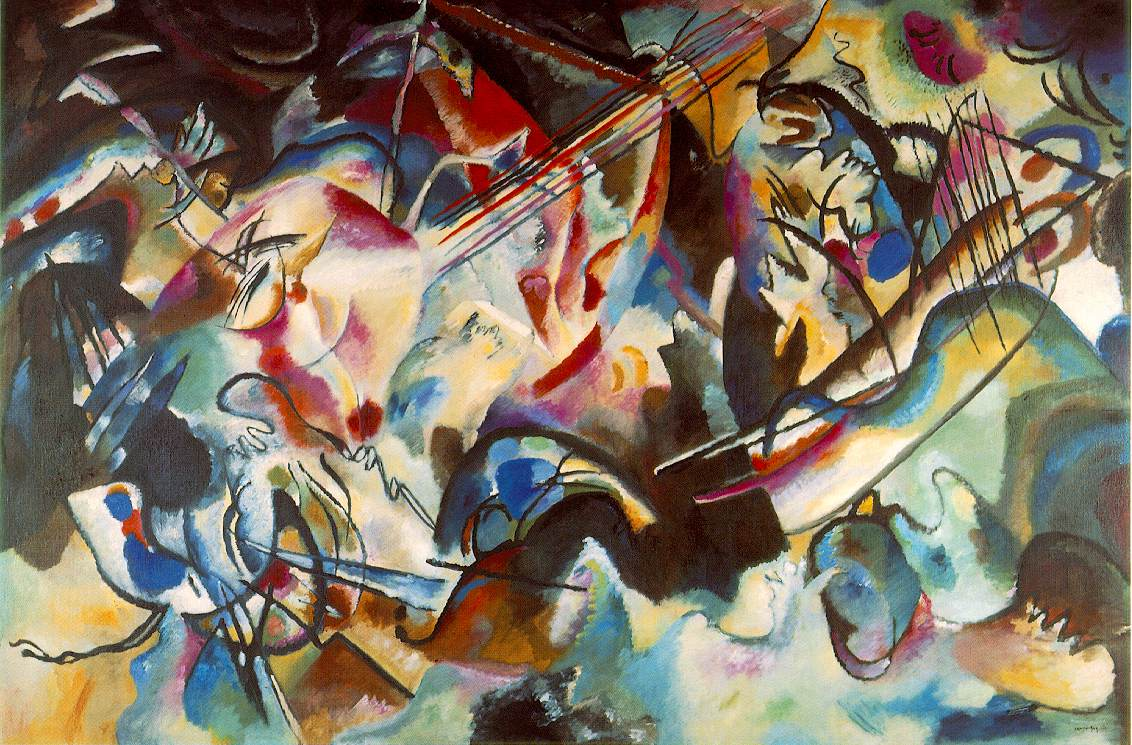
Abstract: Composition VI by Wassily Kandinsky (1913)

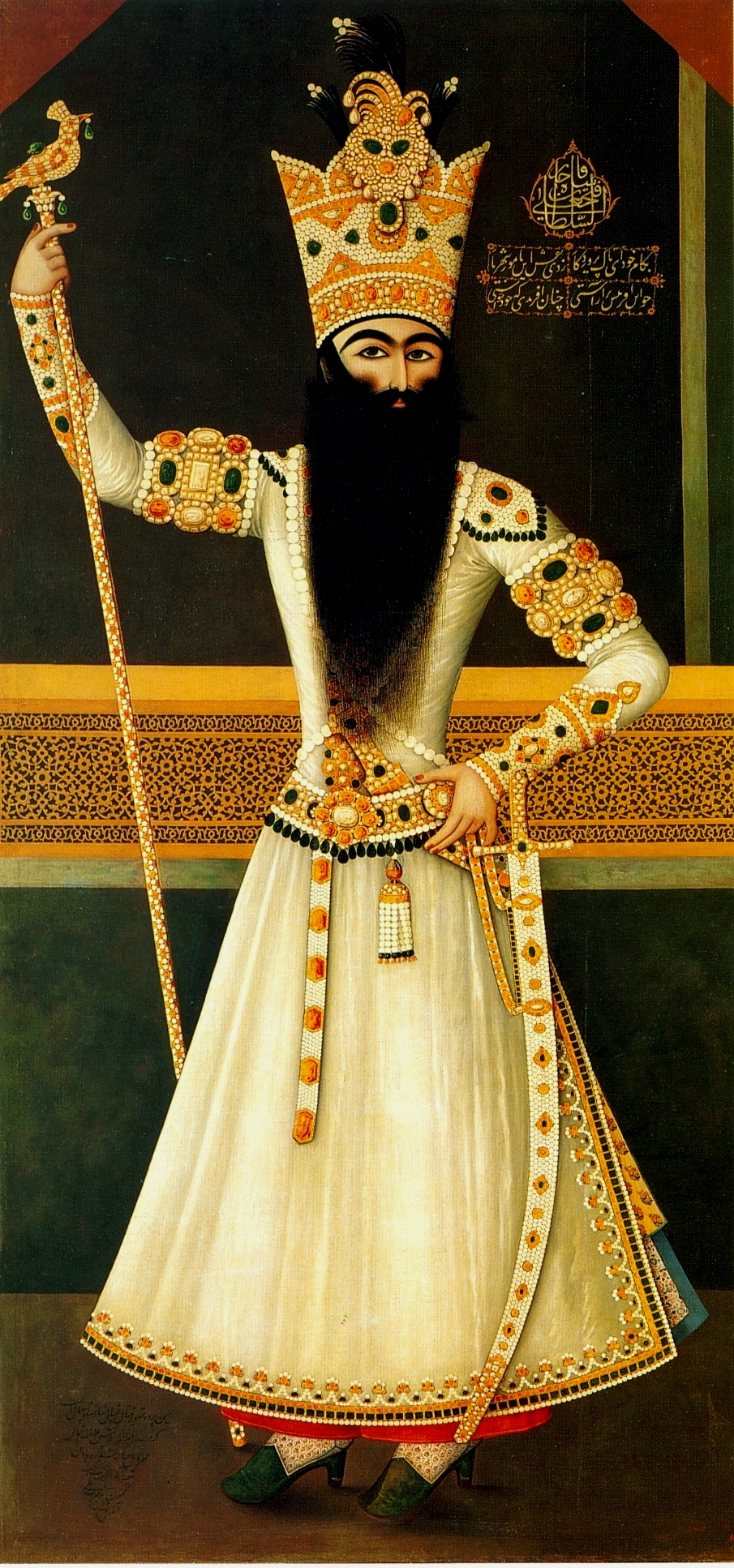
Persian: Portrait of Fath Ali Shah (1813–1814)

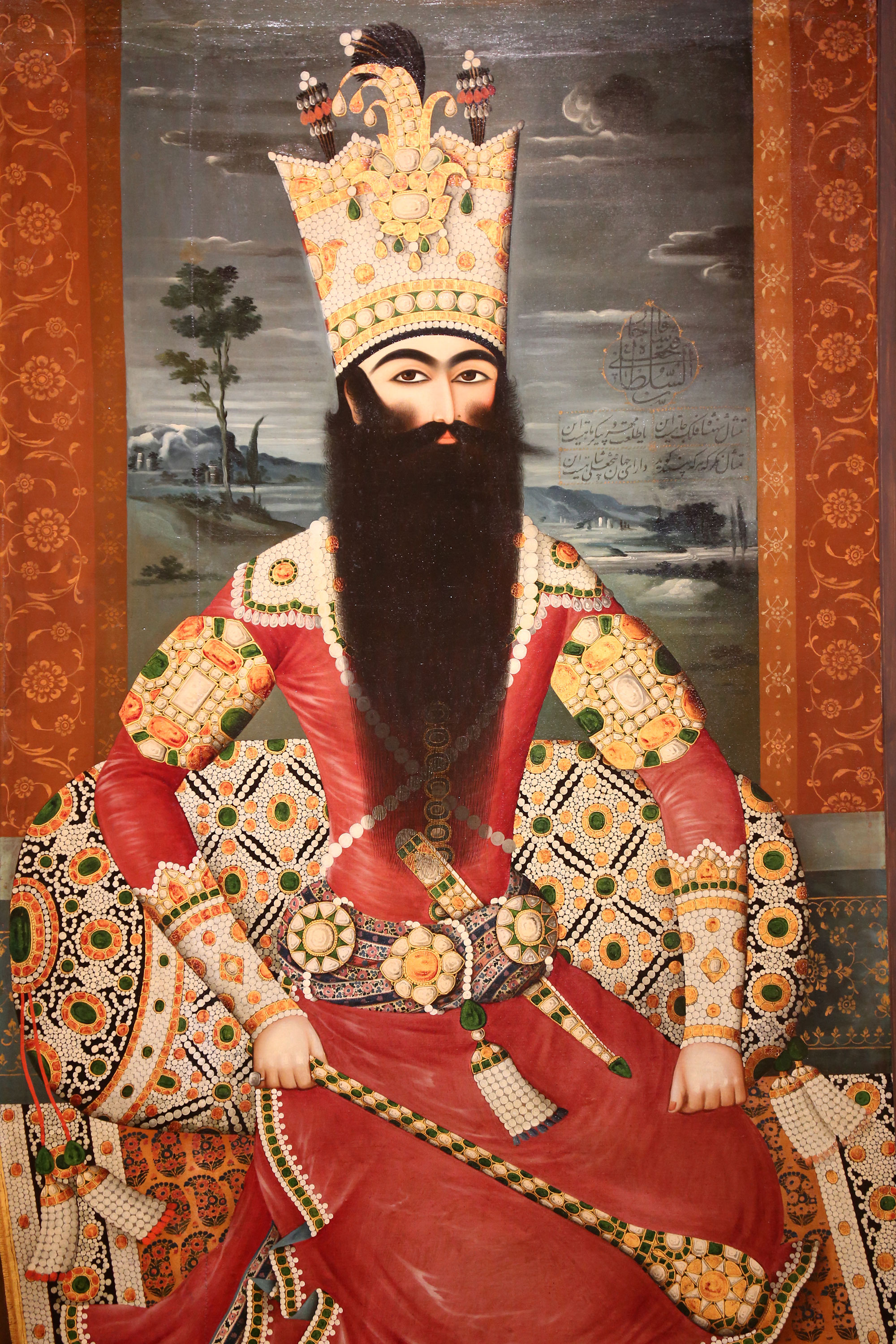
Hall of Iran

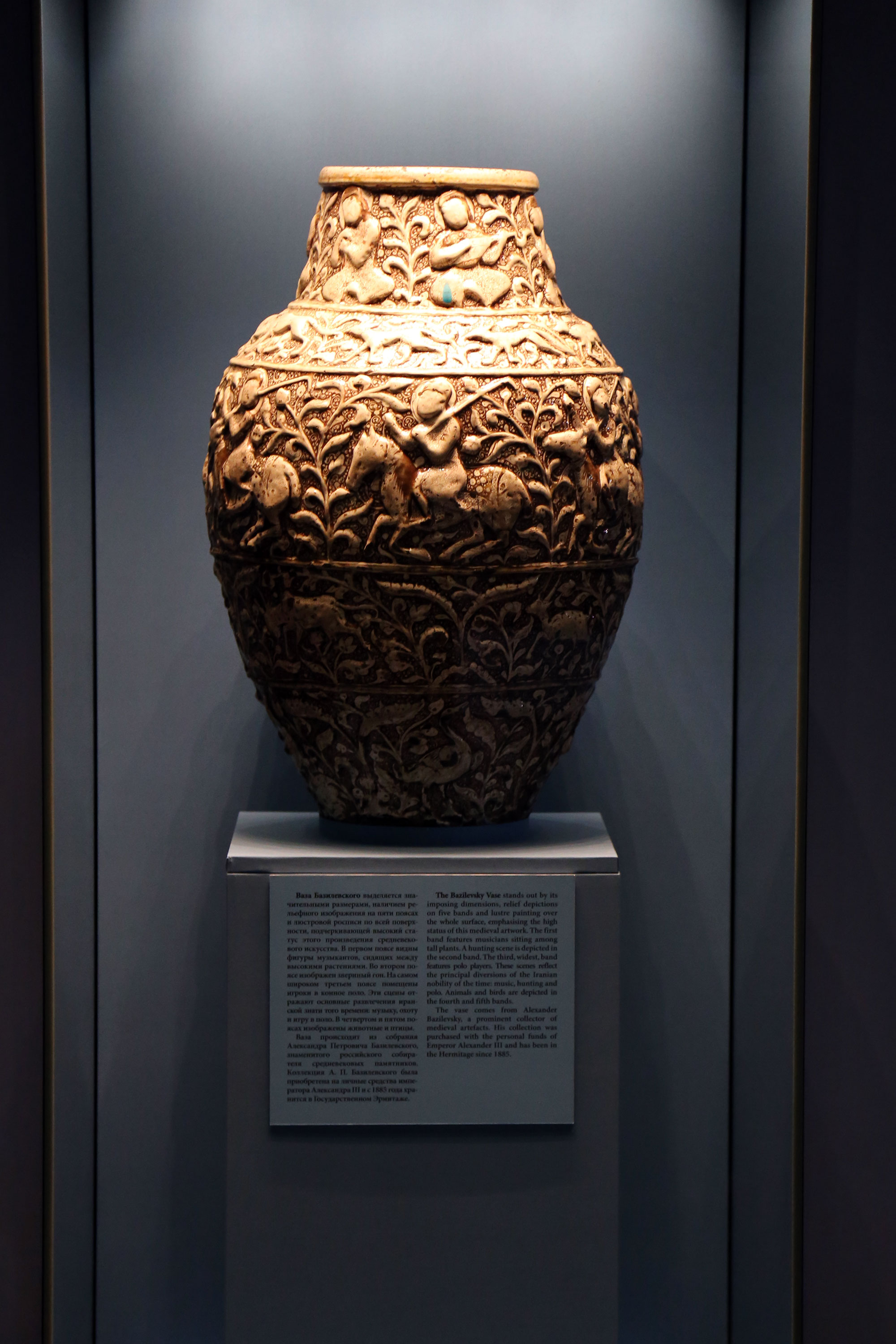
Hall of Iran
Building Hermitage Museum, Saint Petersburg, Russia

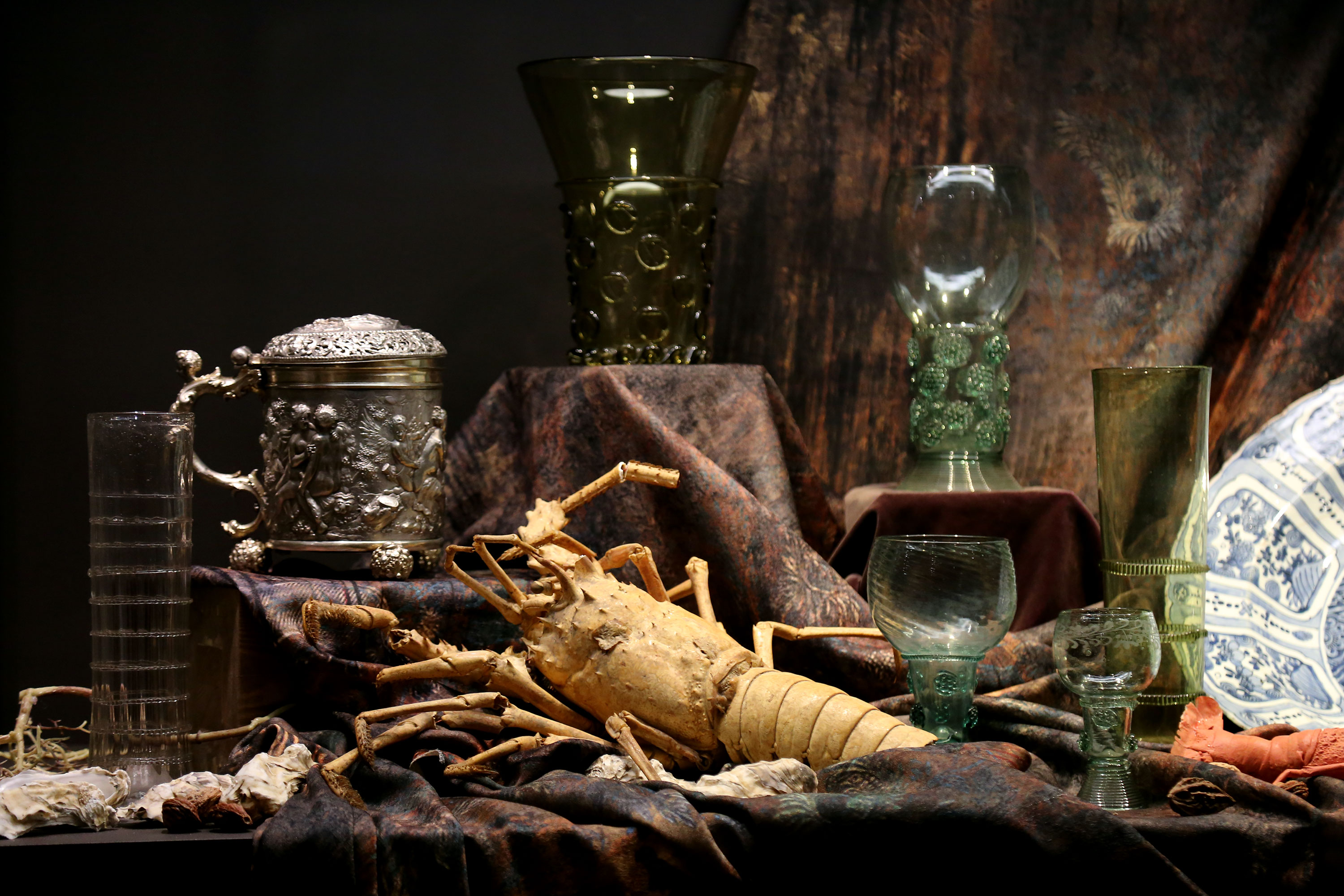

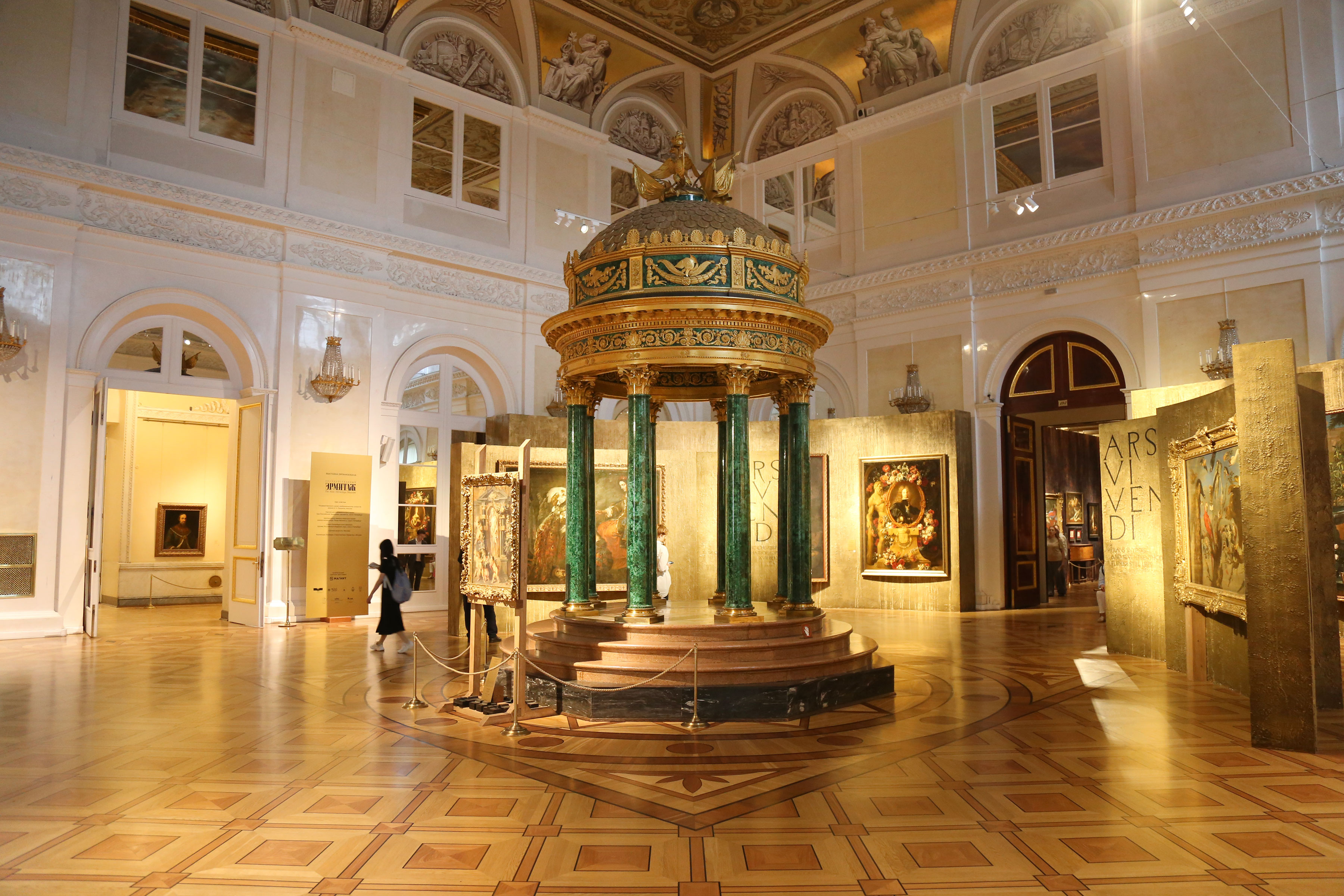

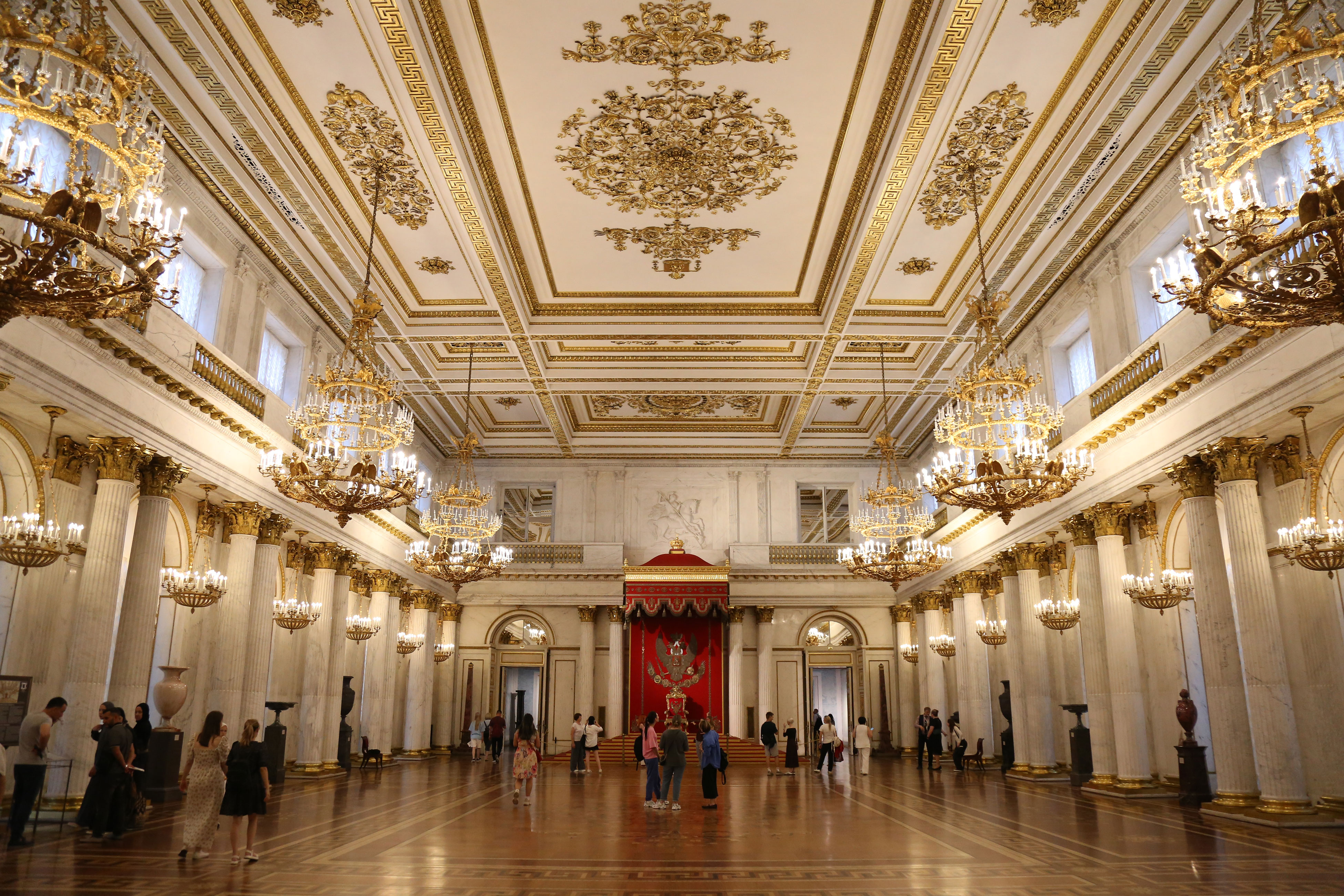

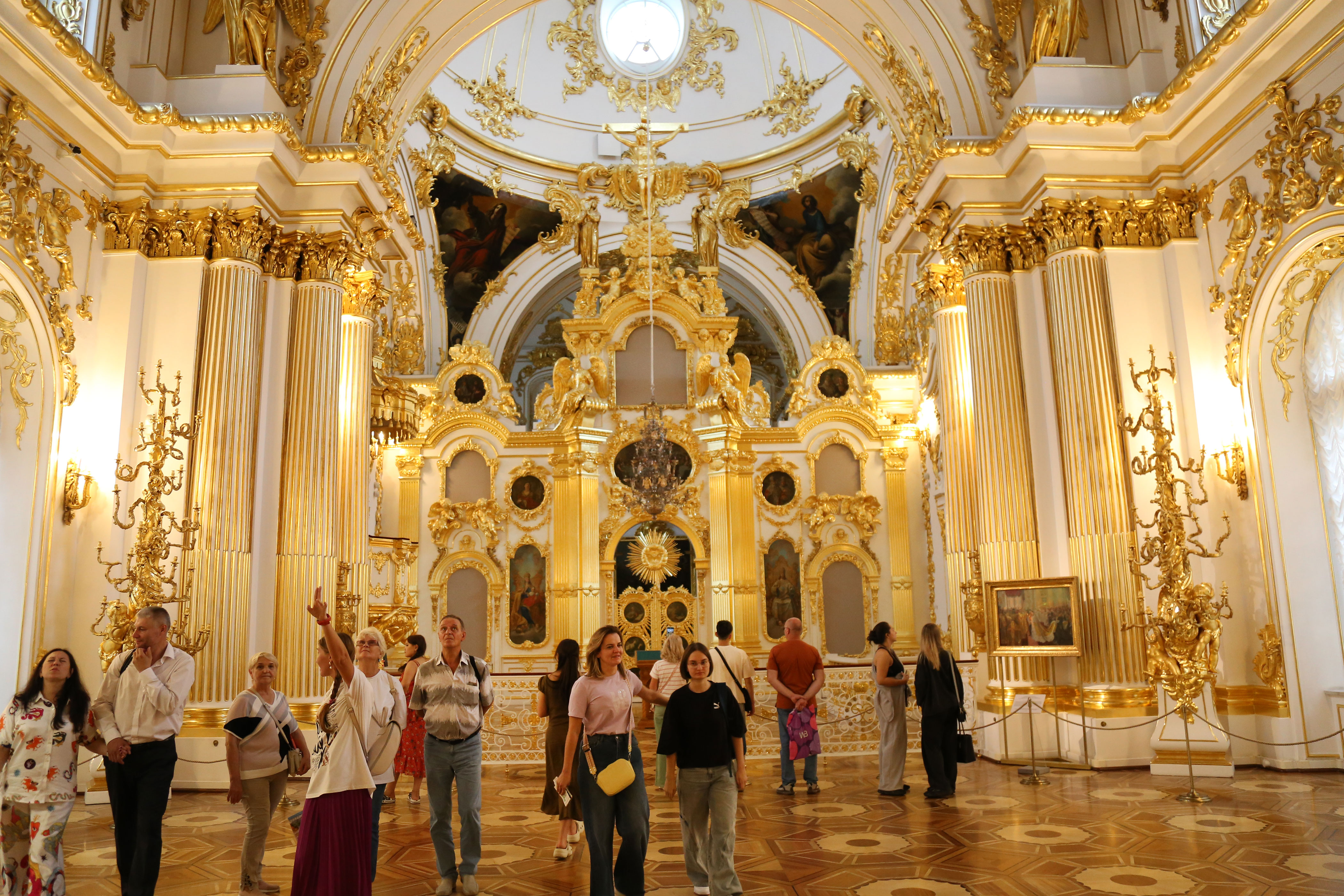

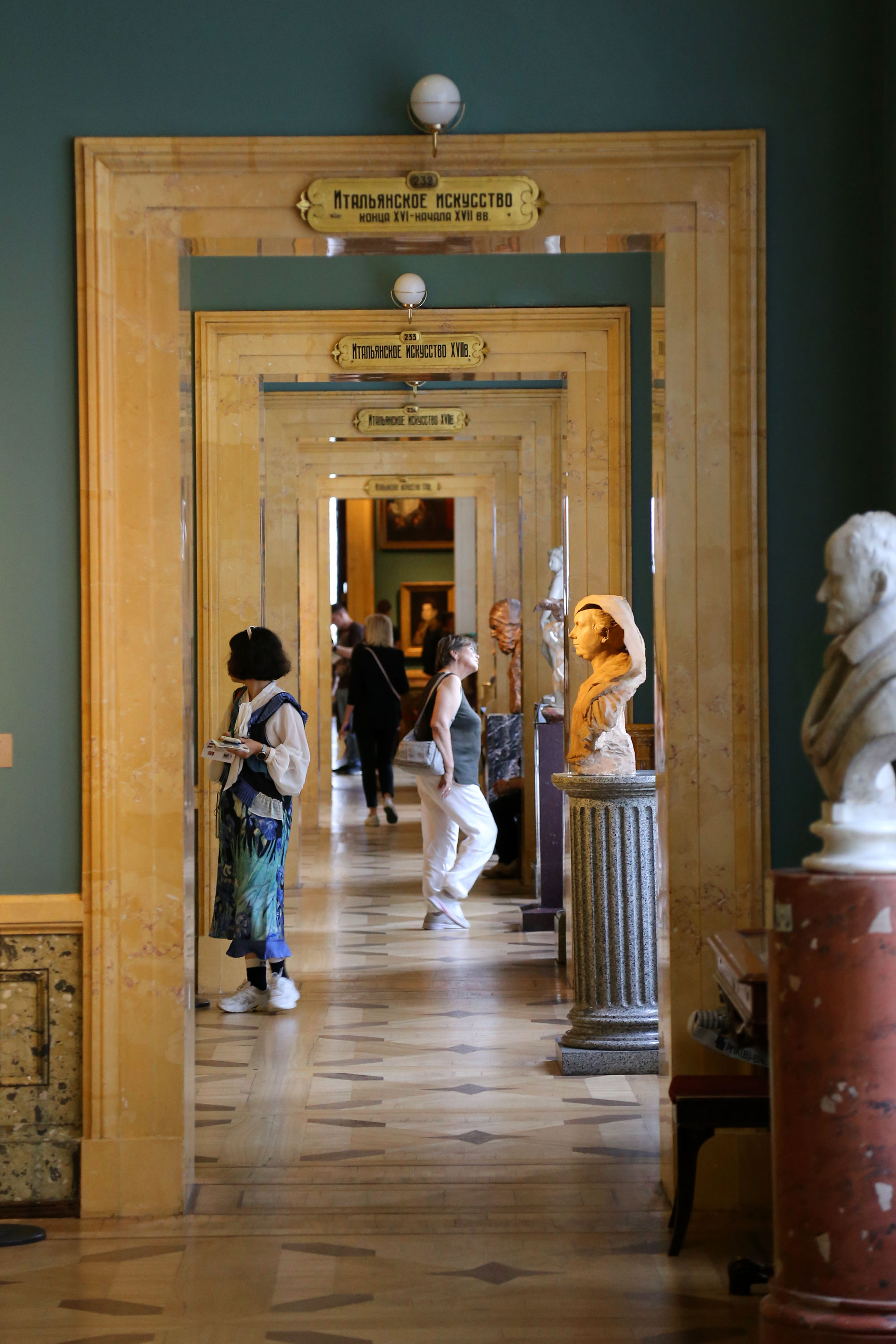

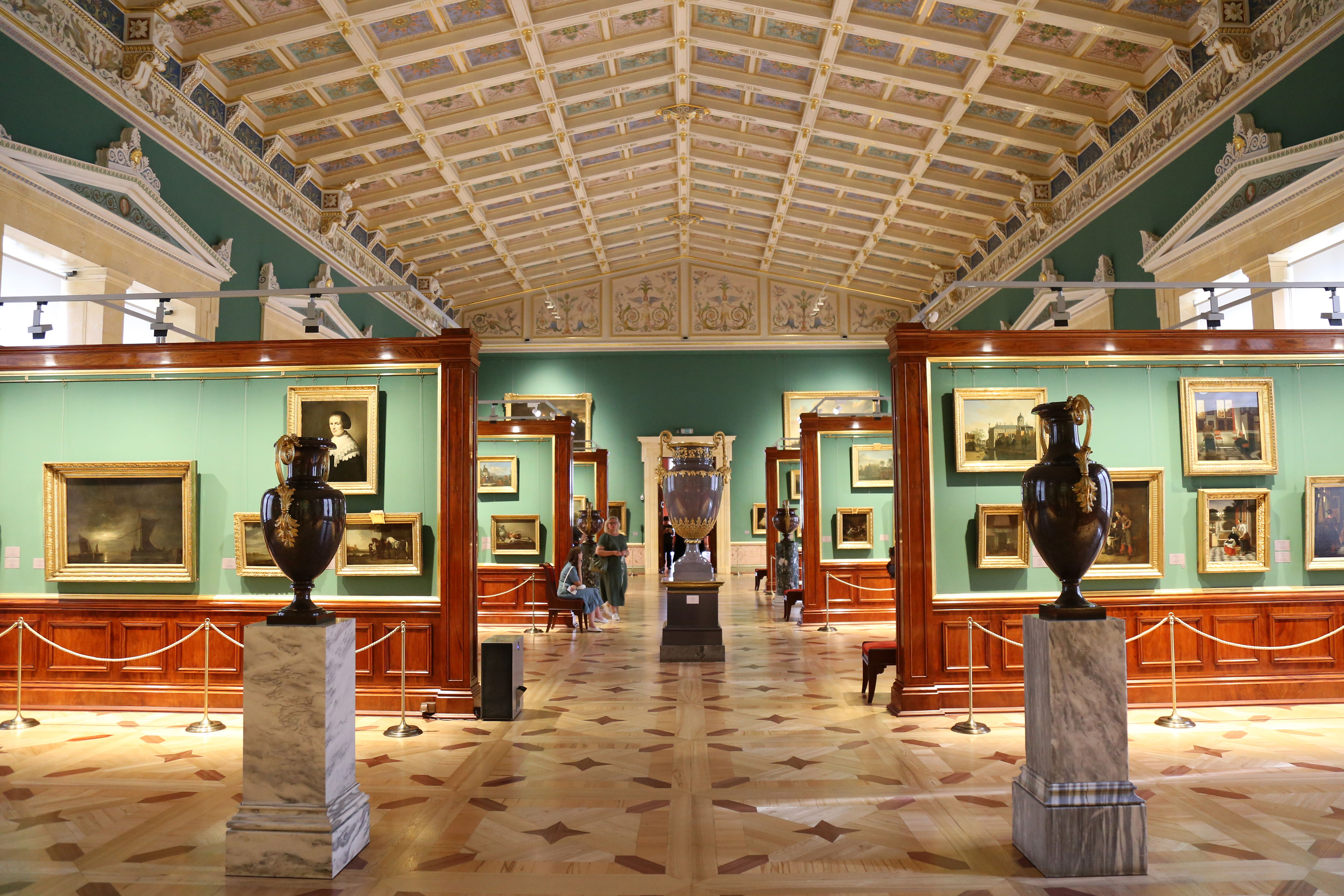

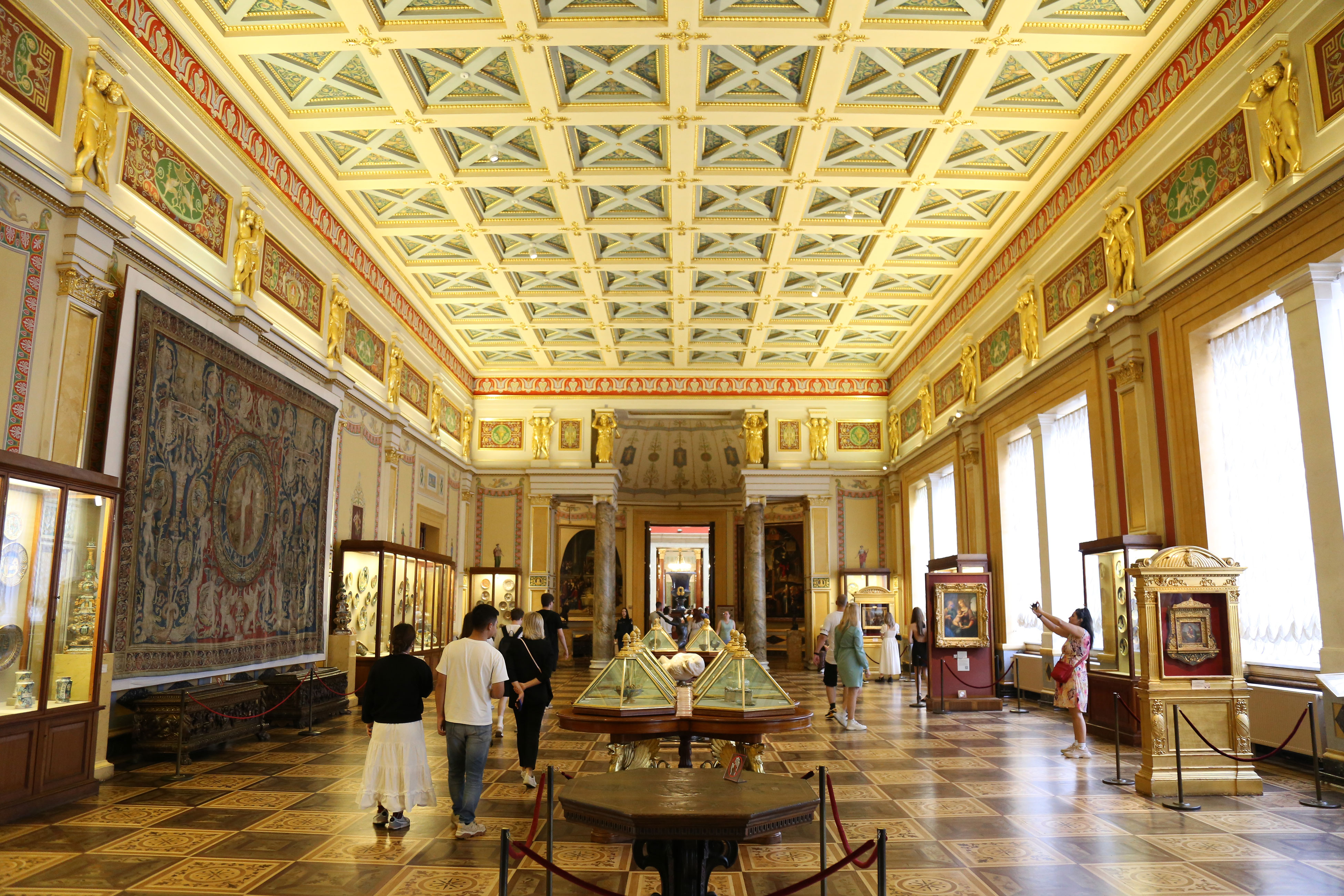

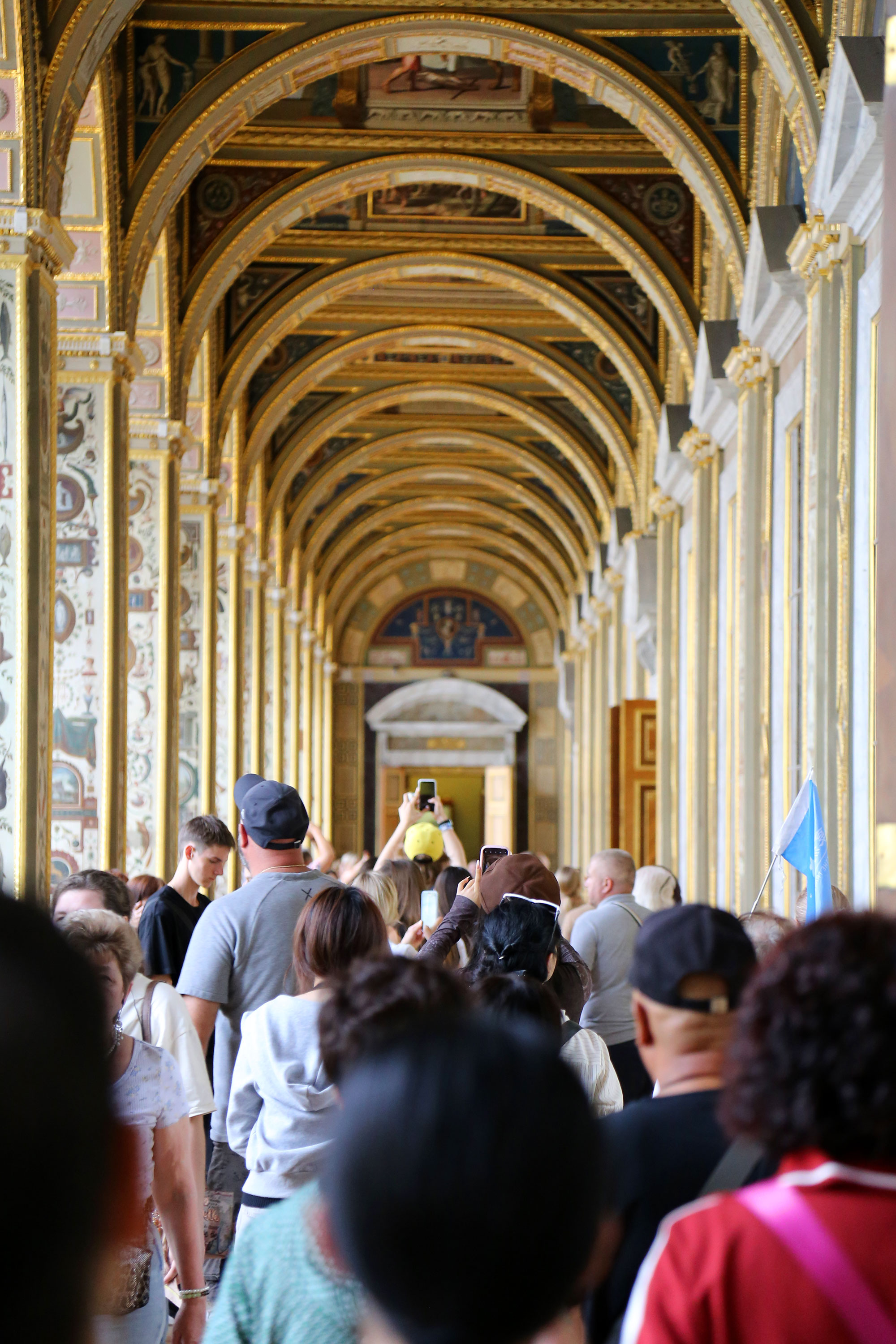

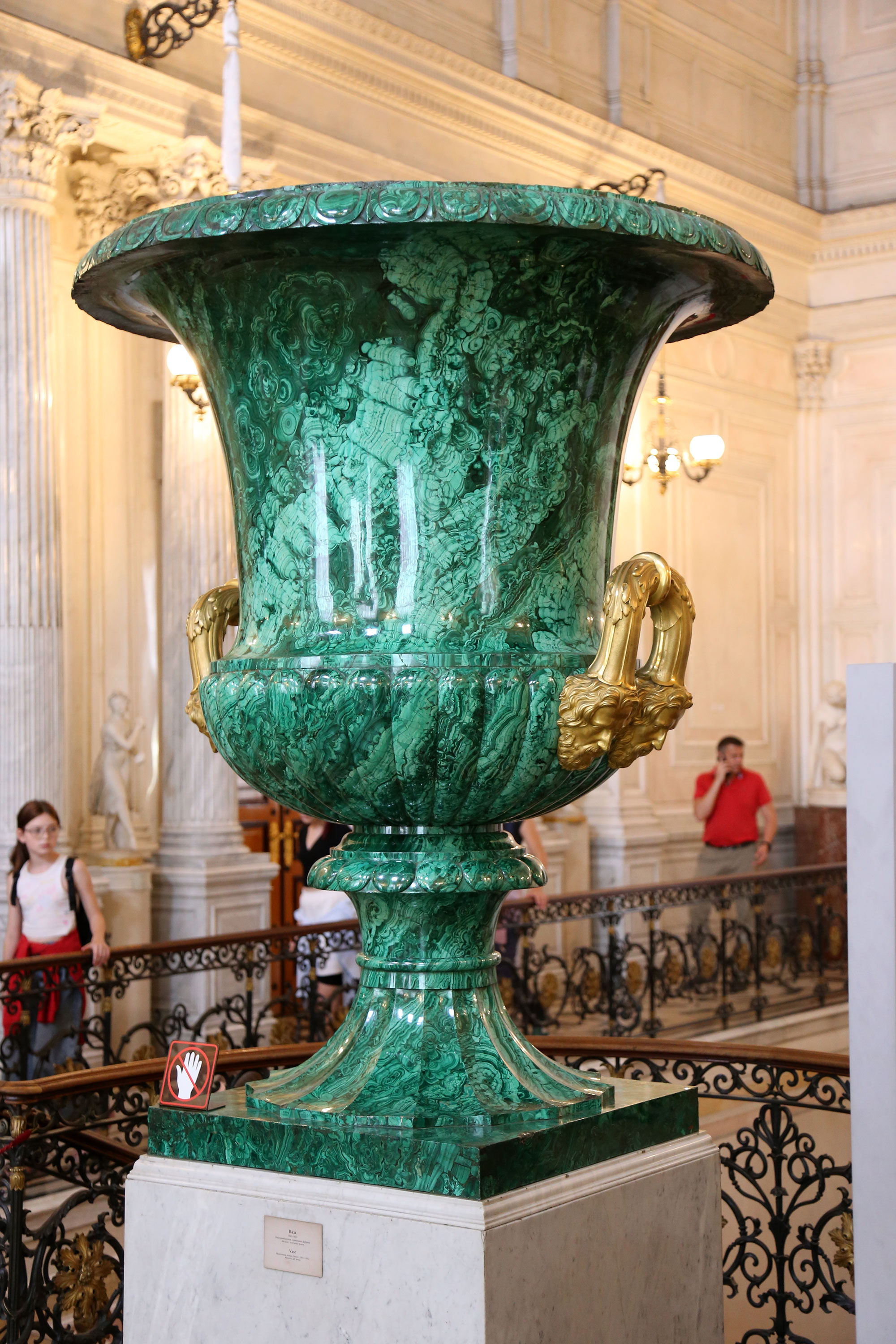

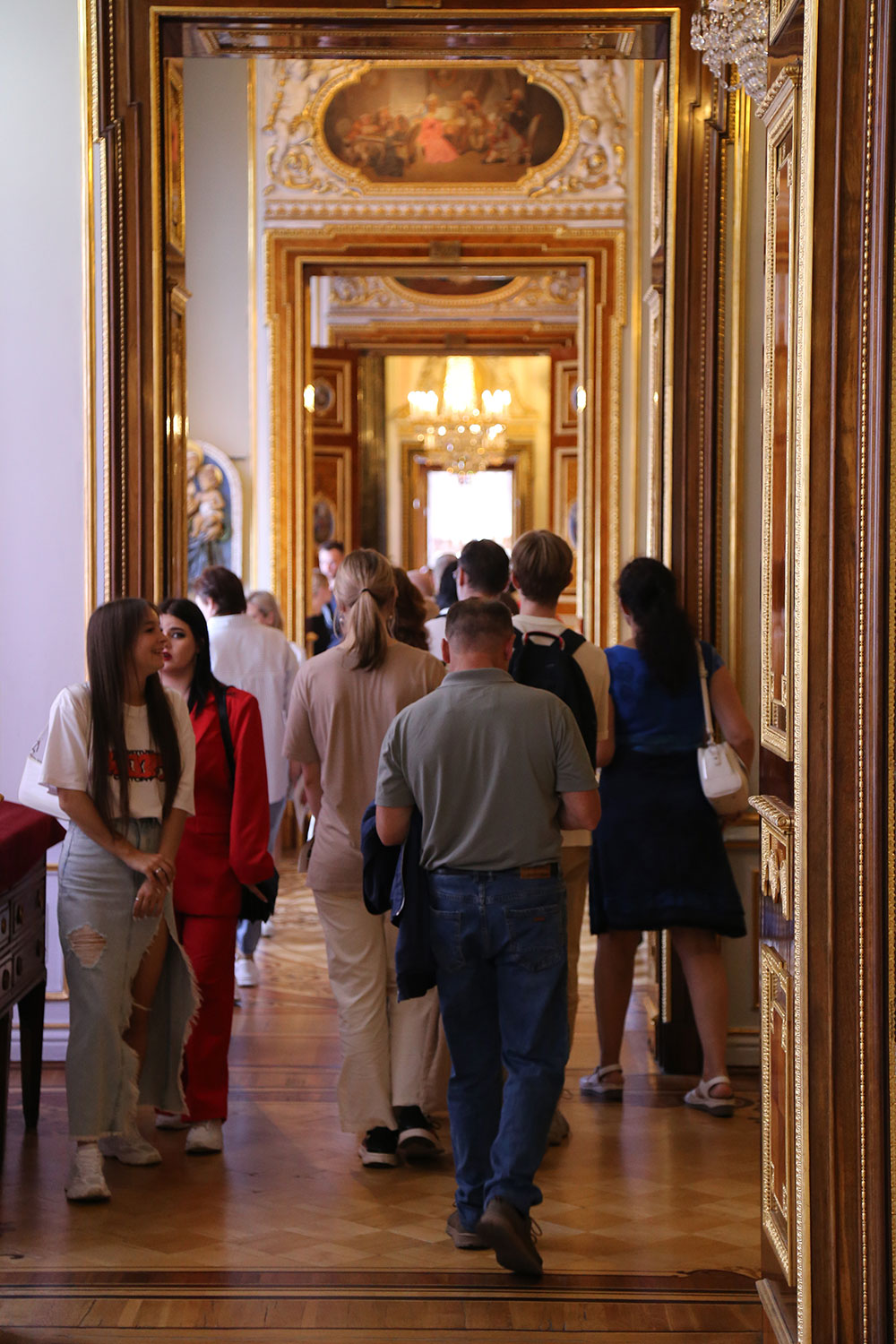

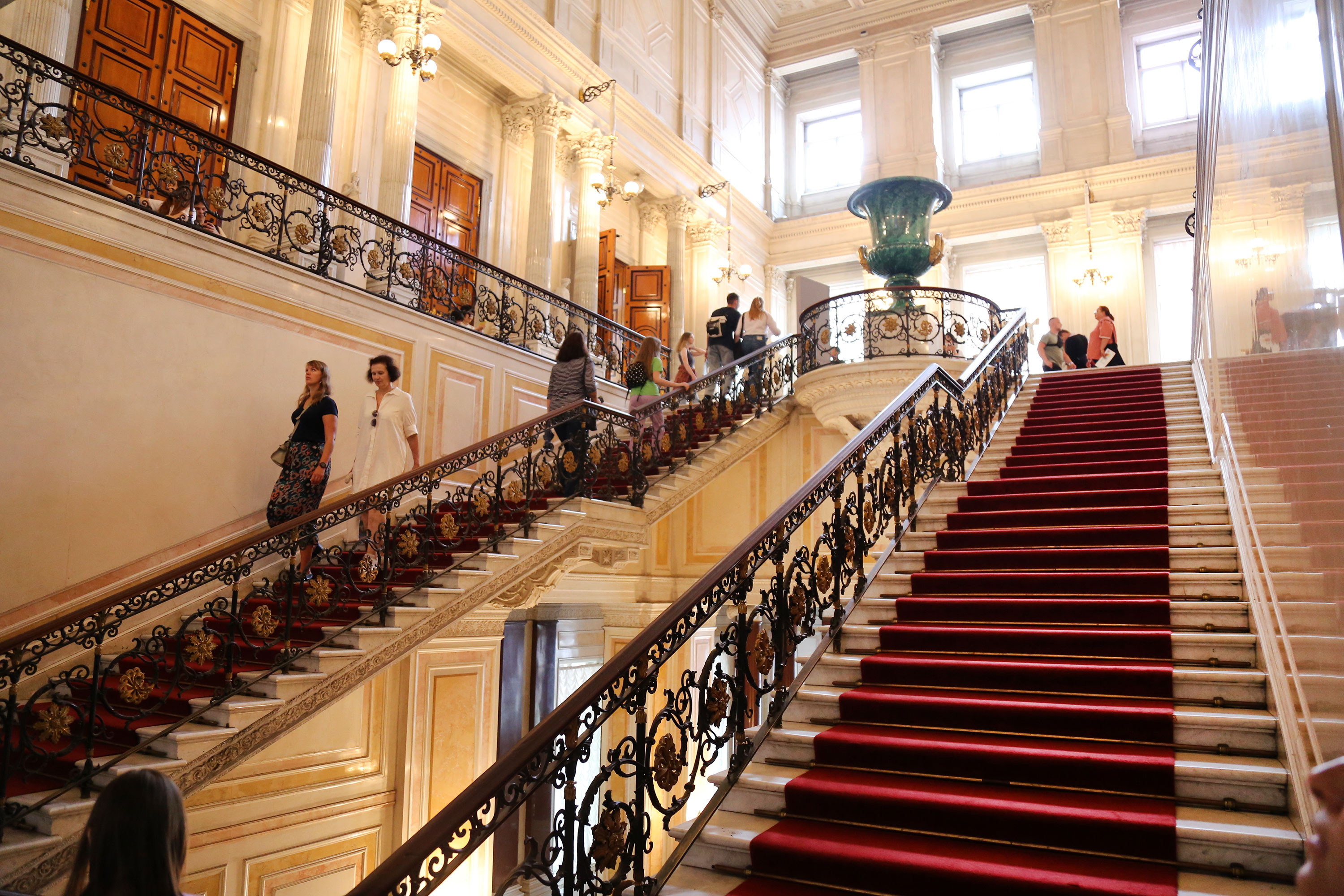

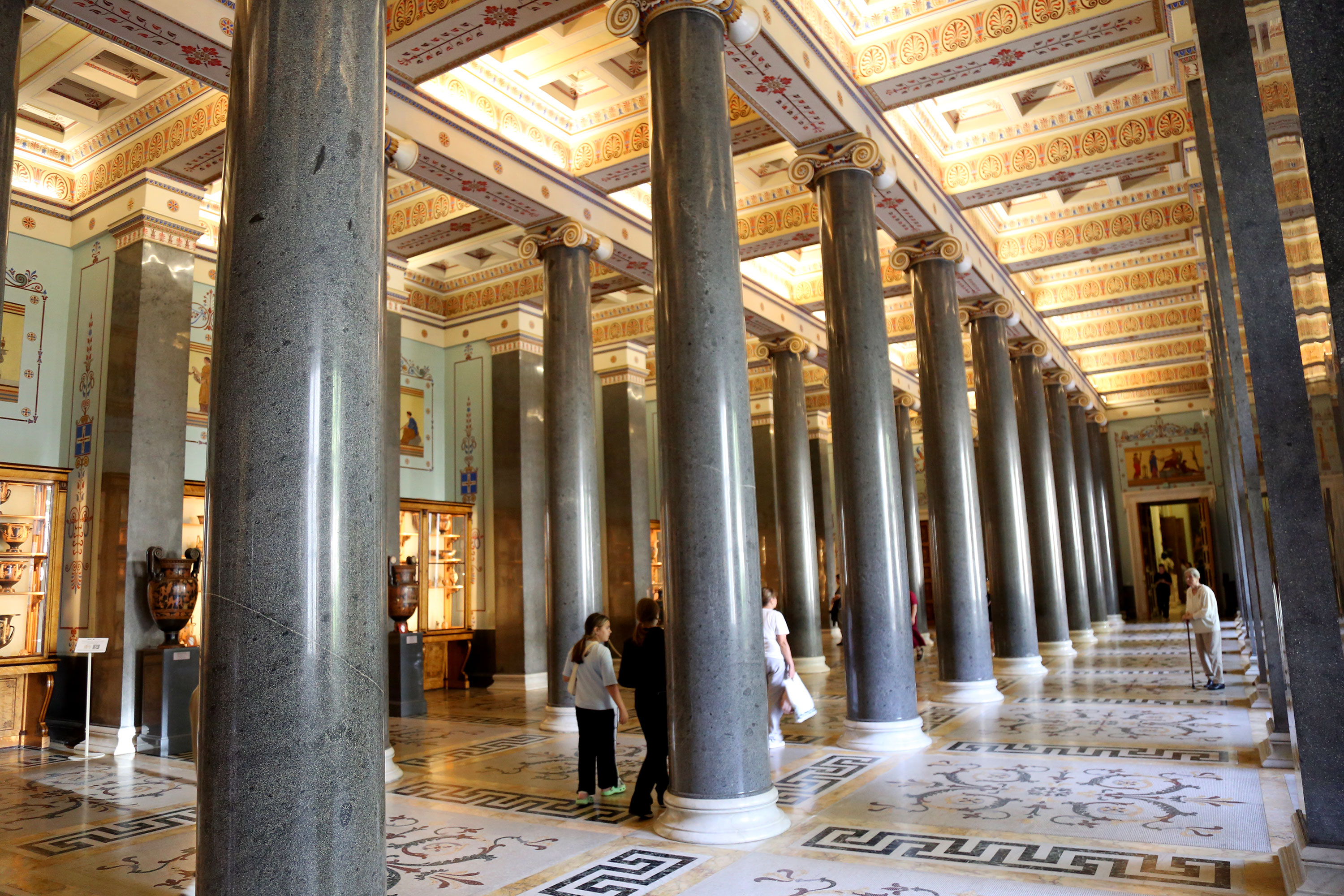

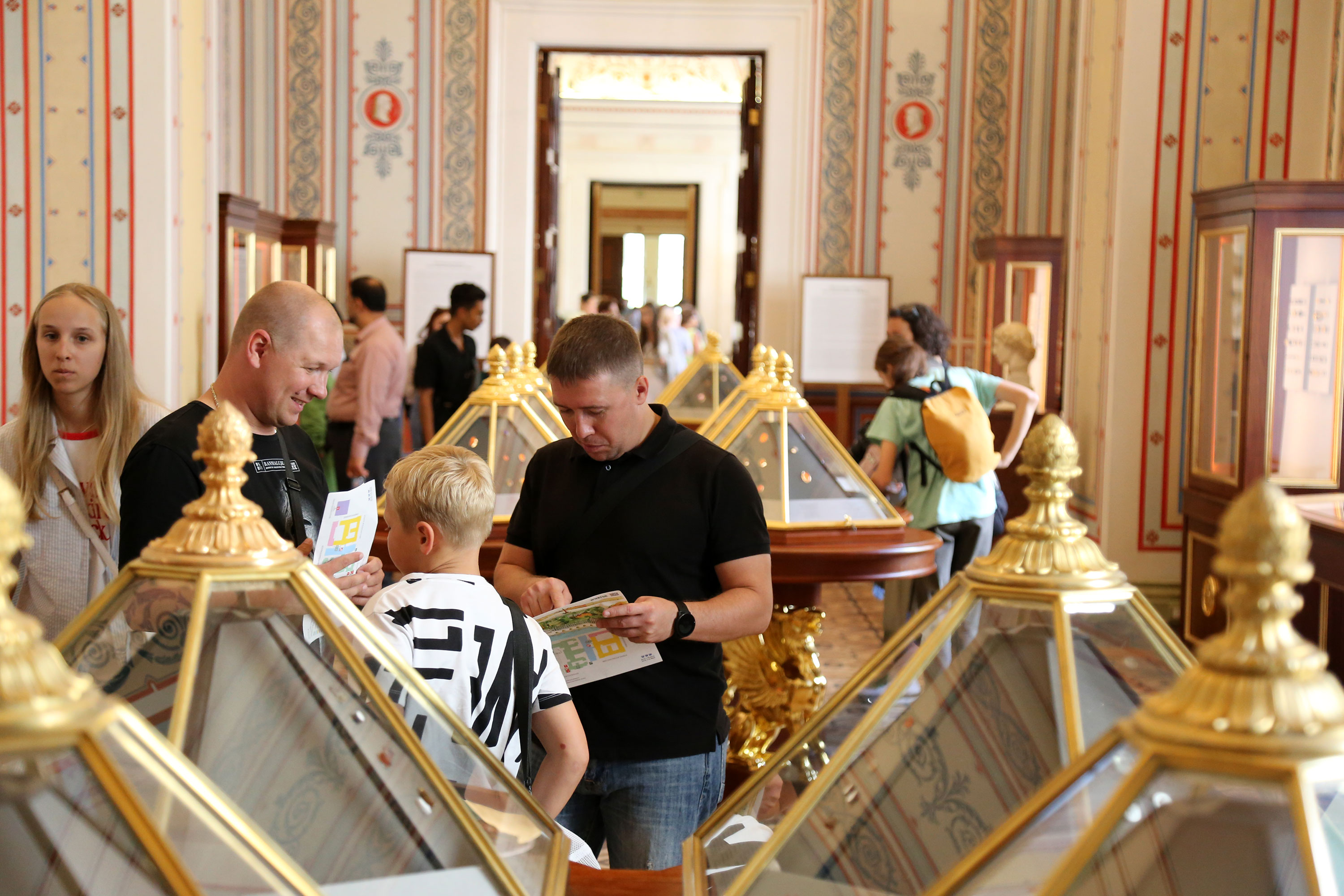

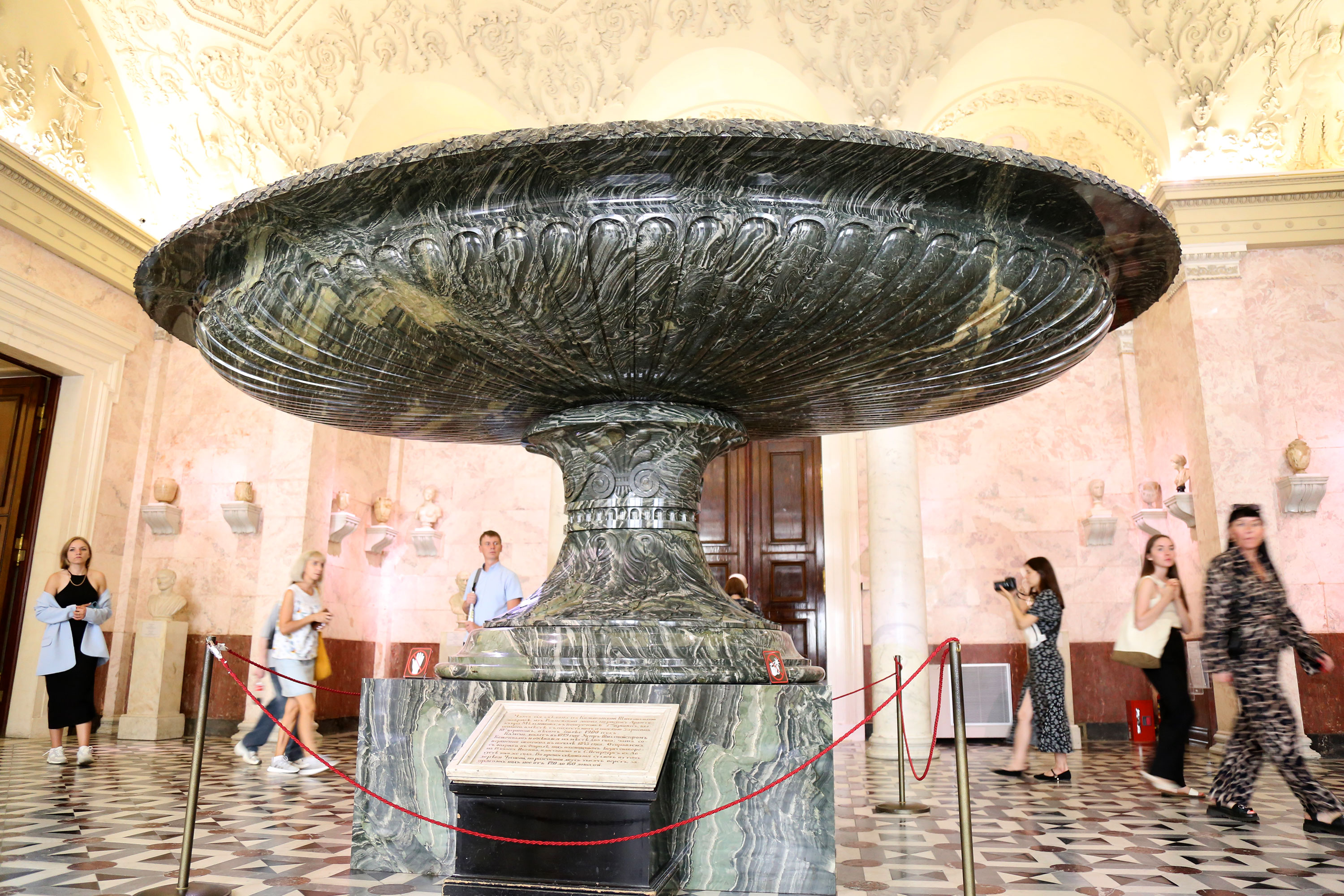

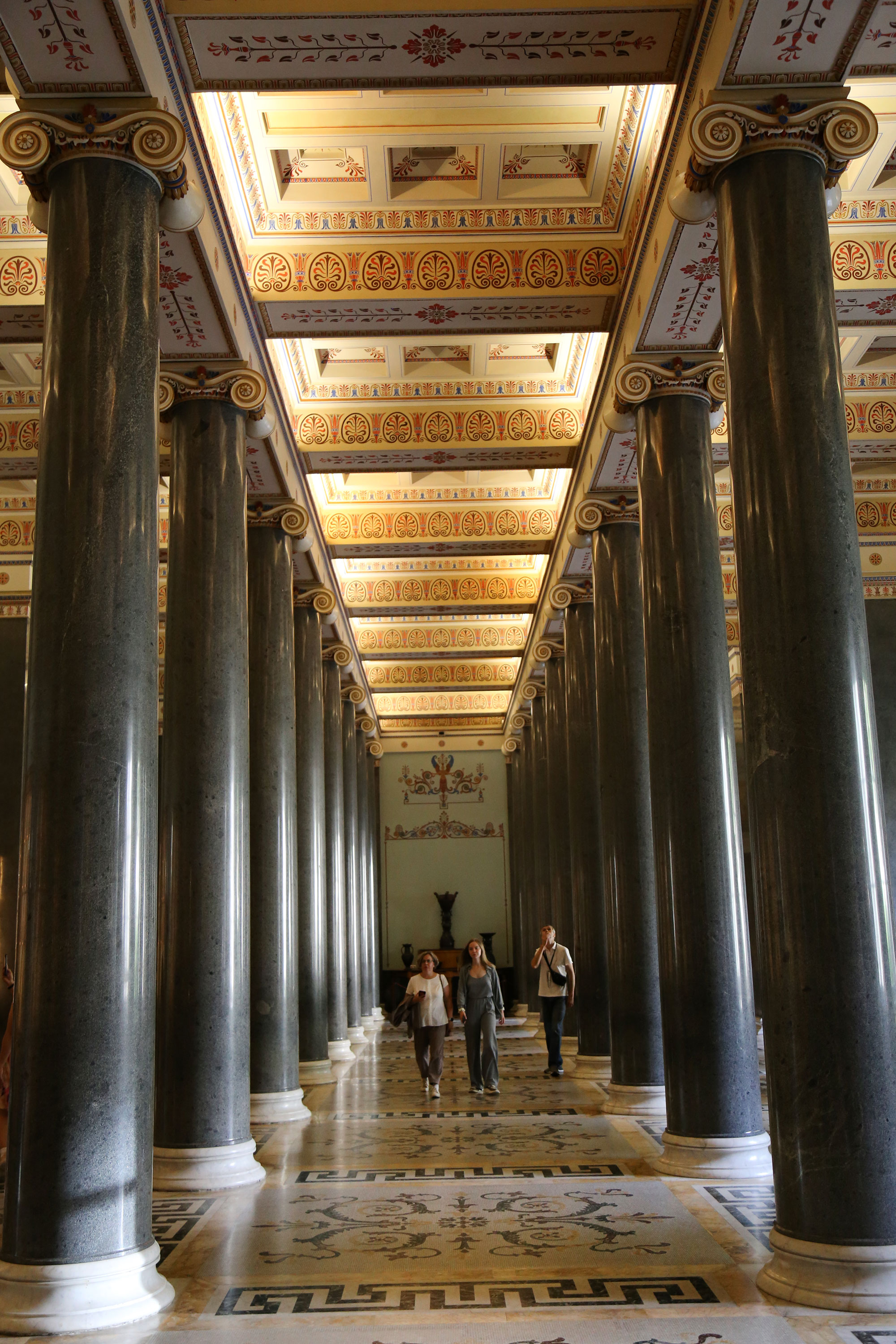

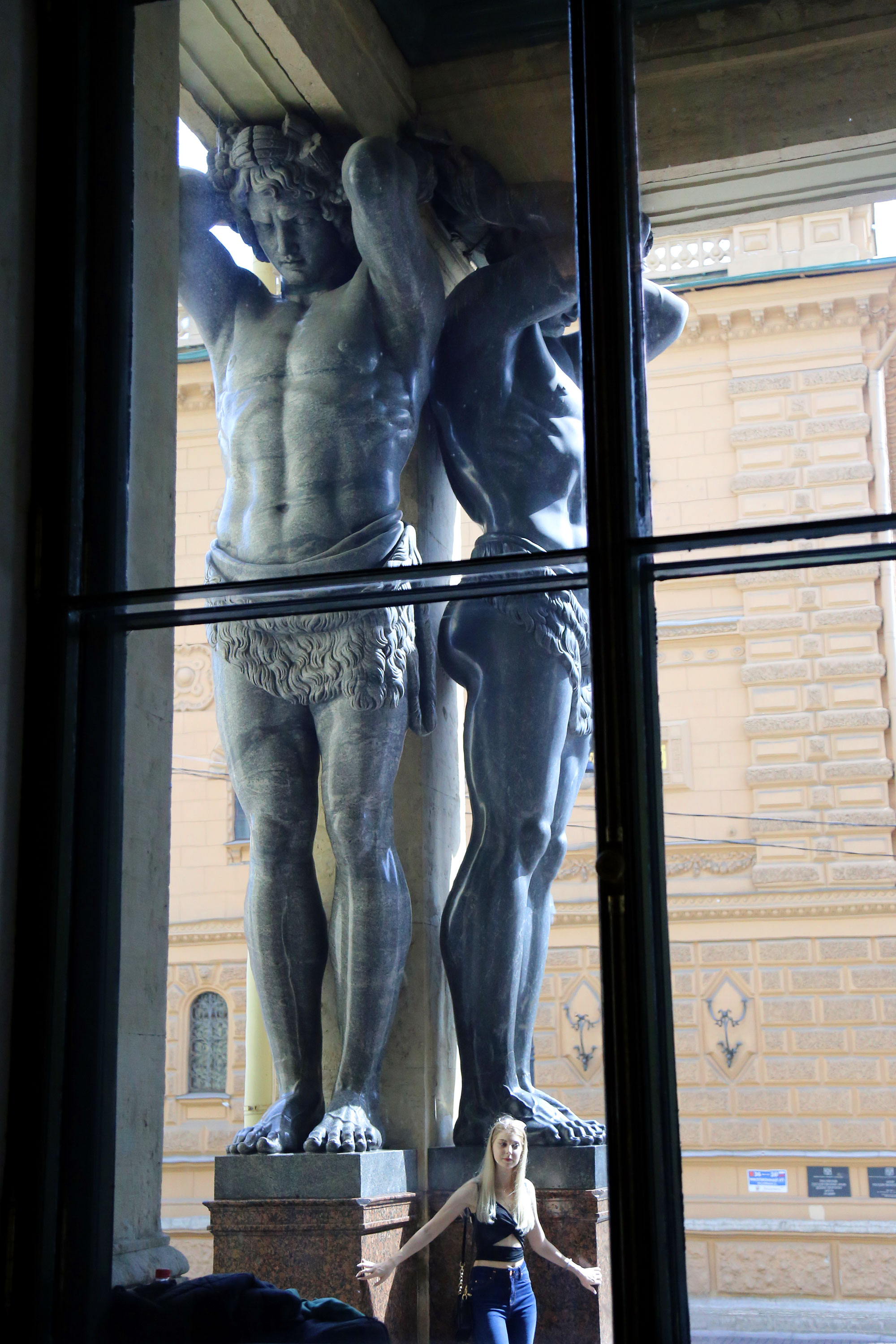

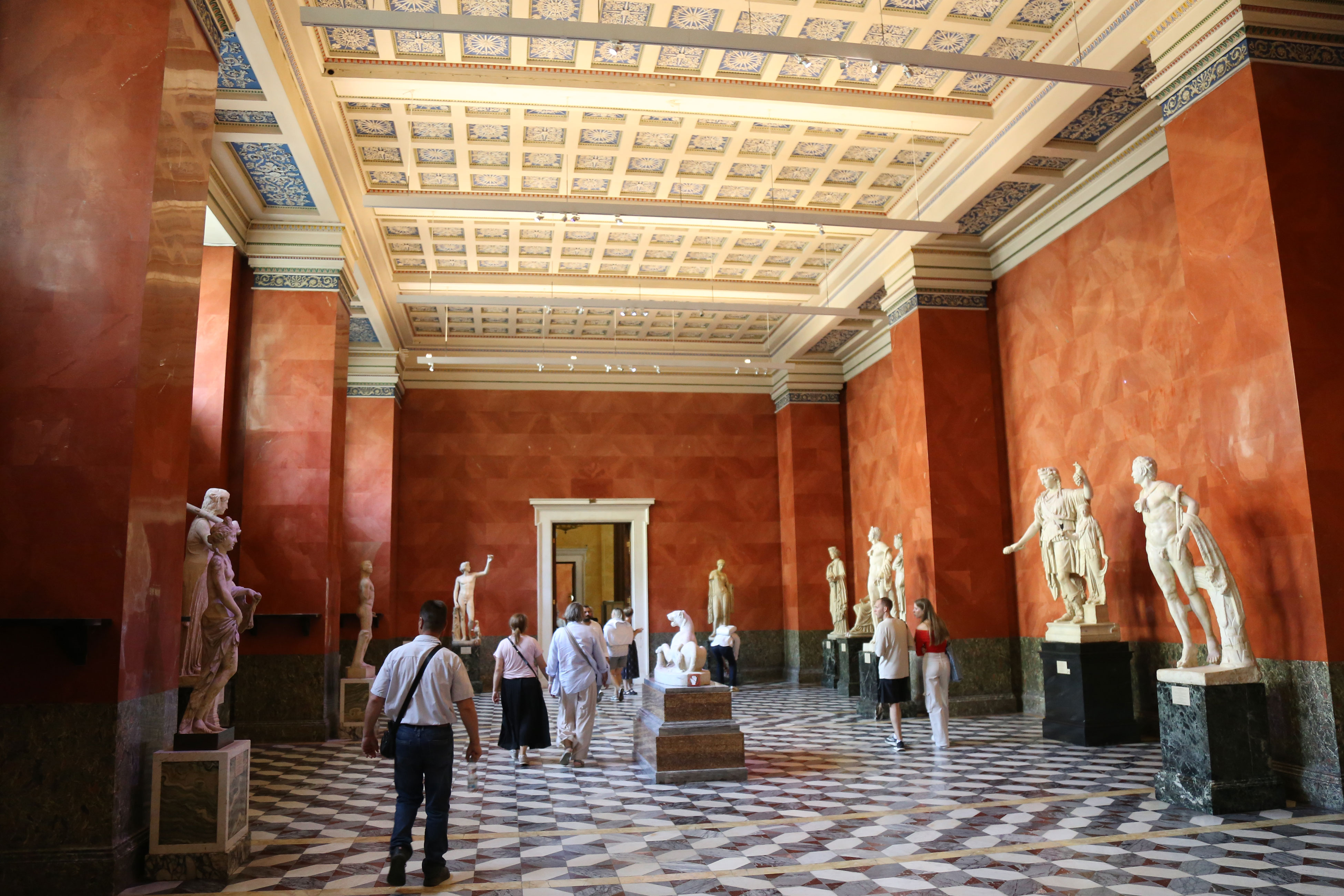

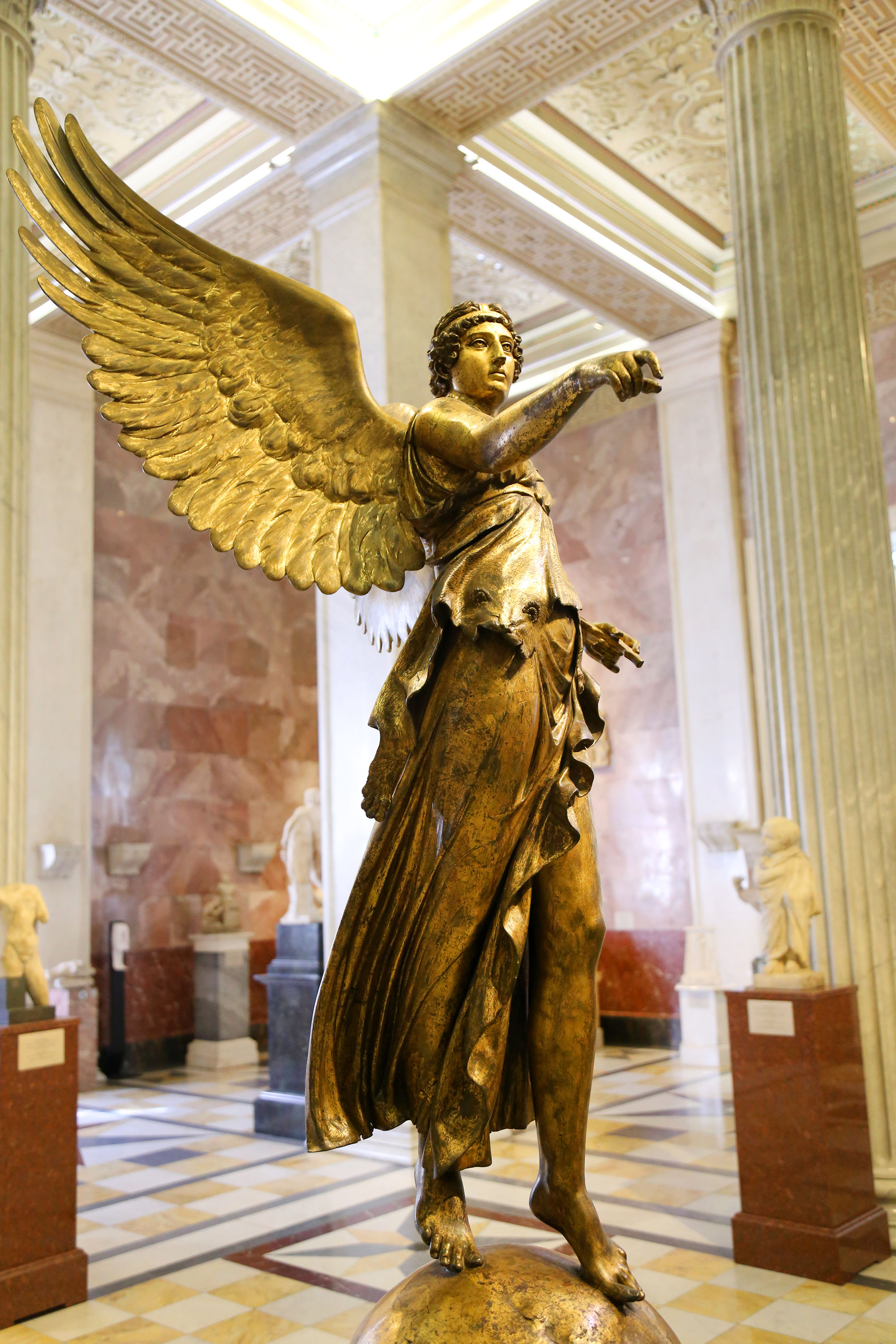

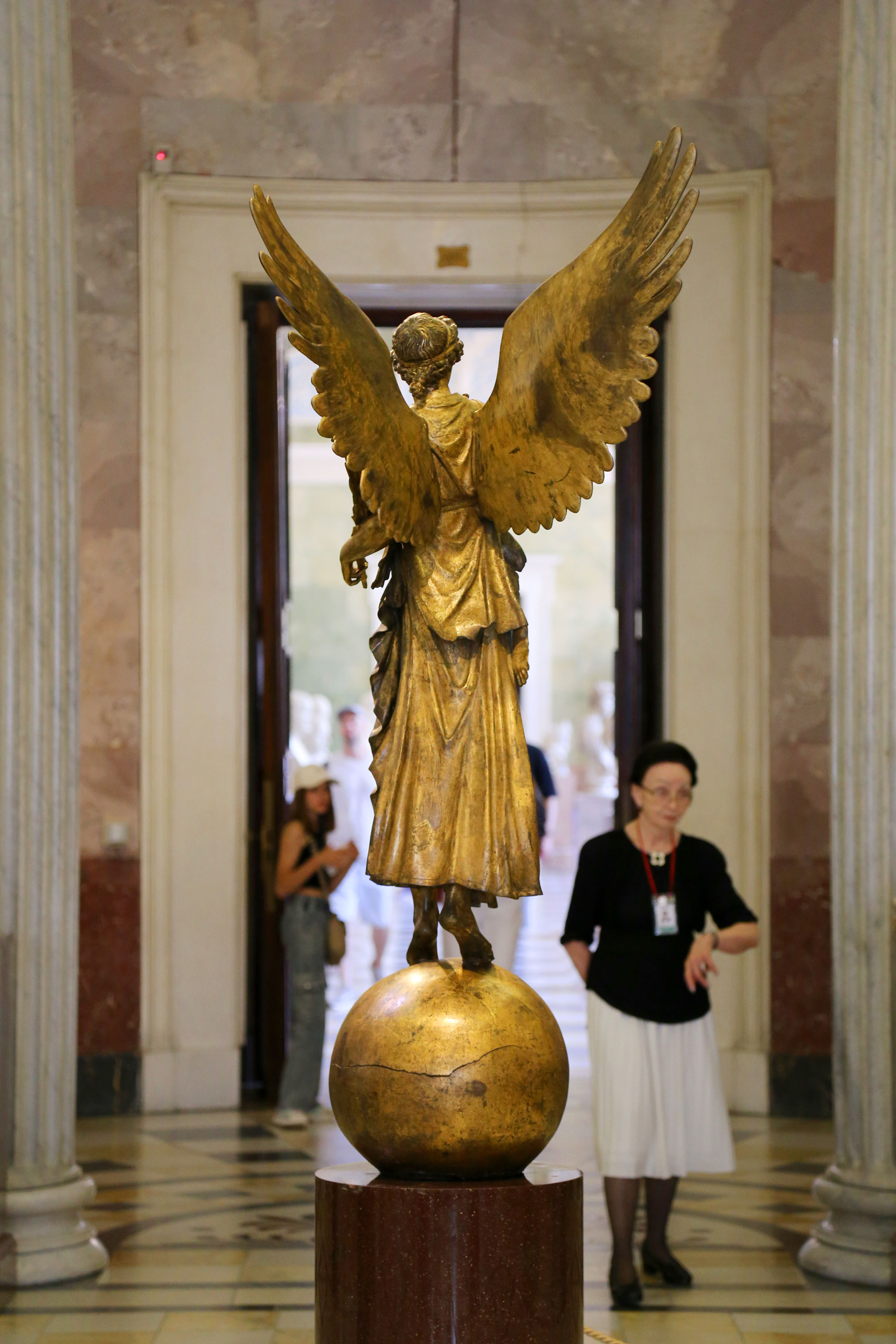

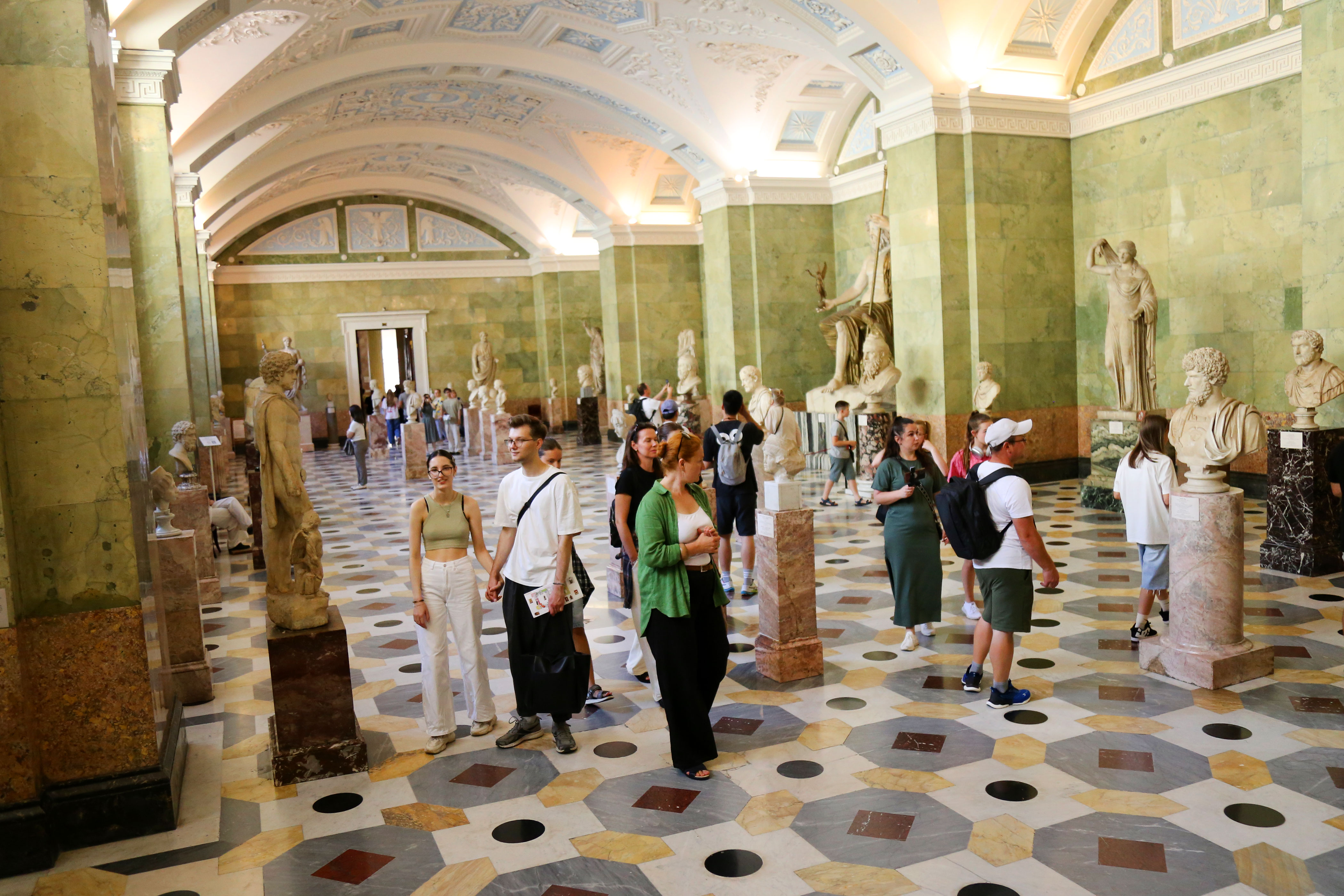

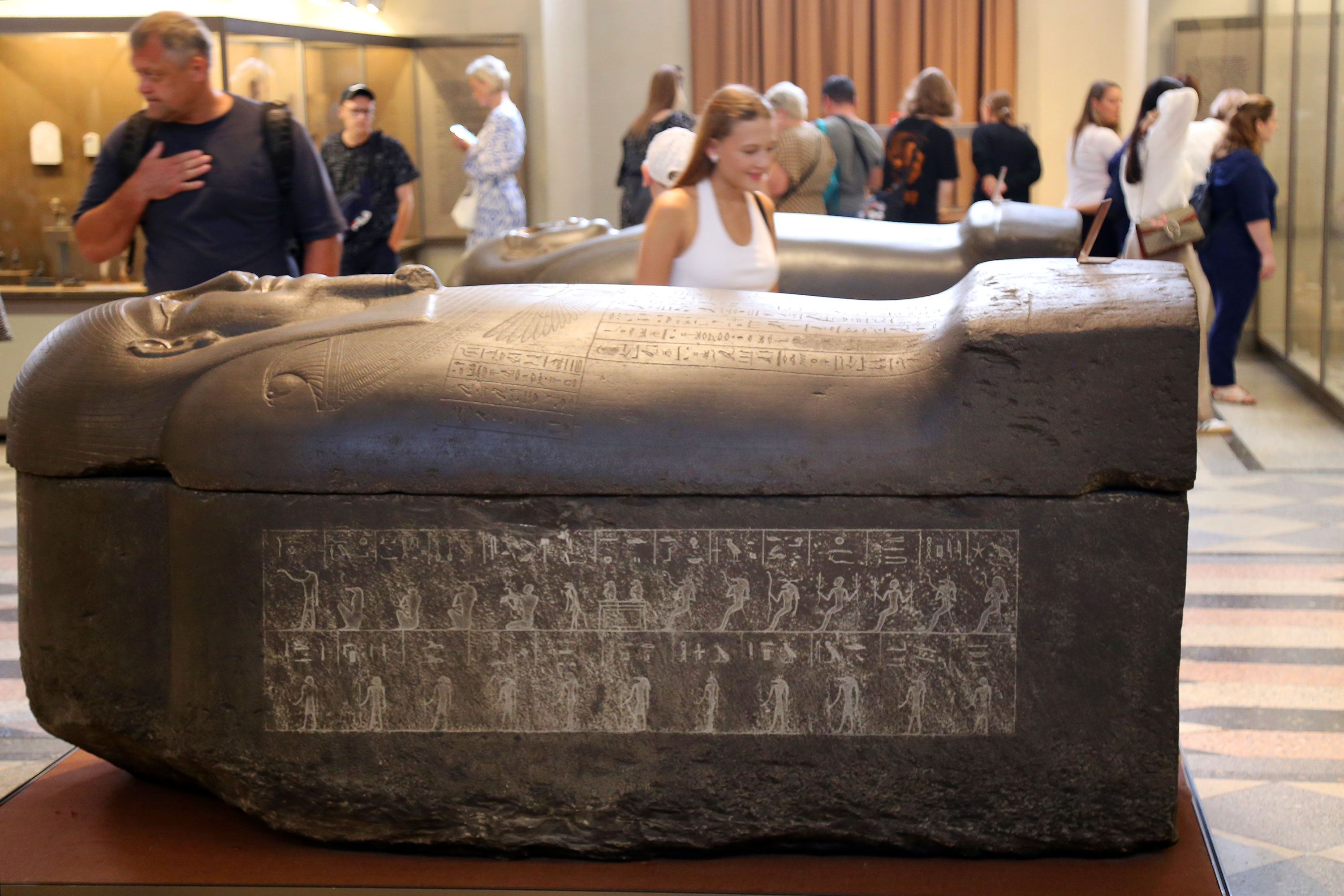
Hall of Egypt

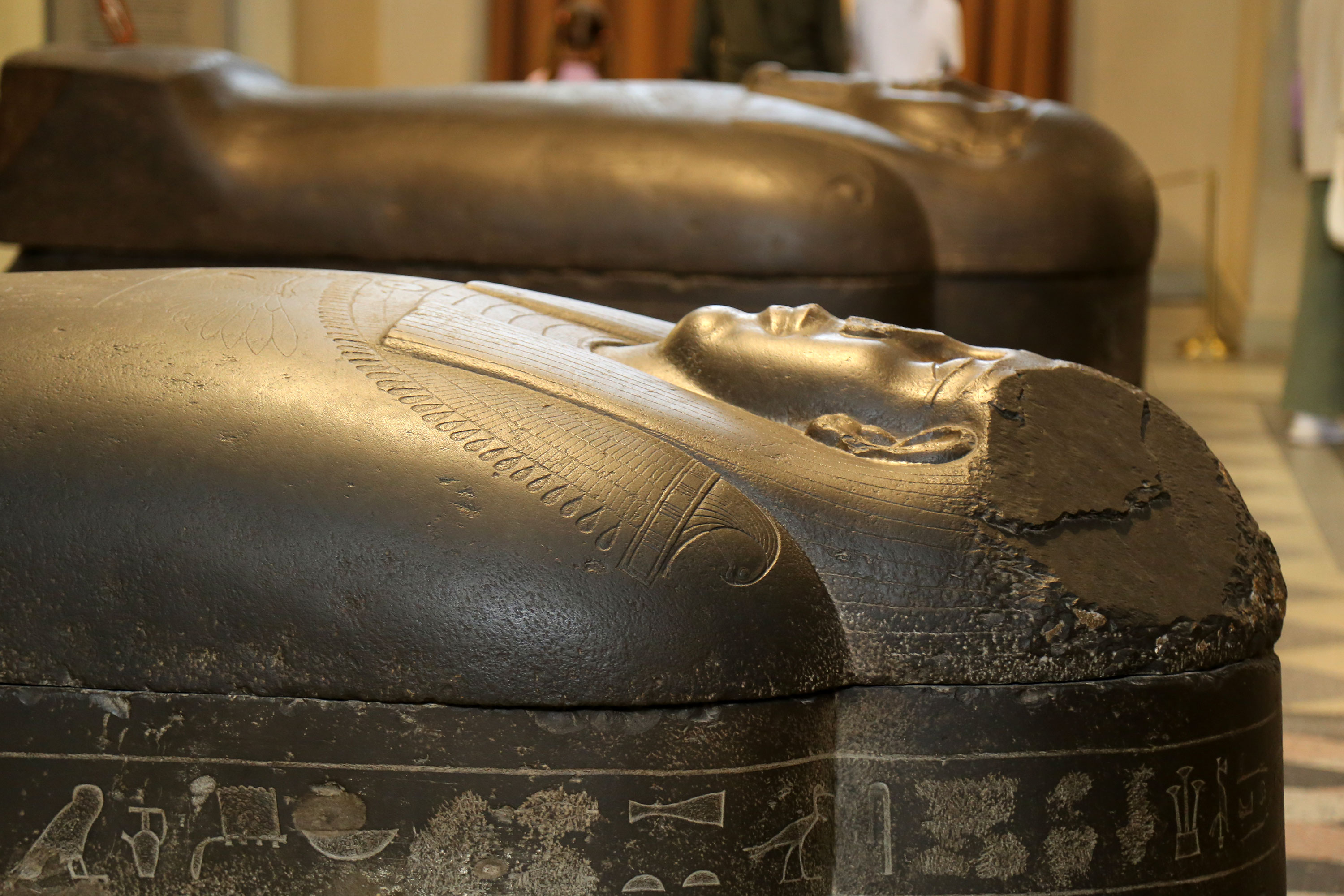
Hall of Egypt

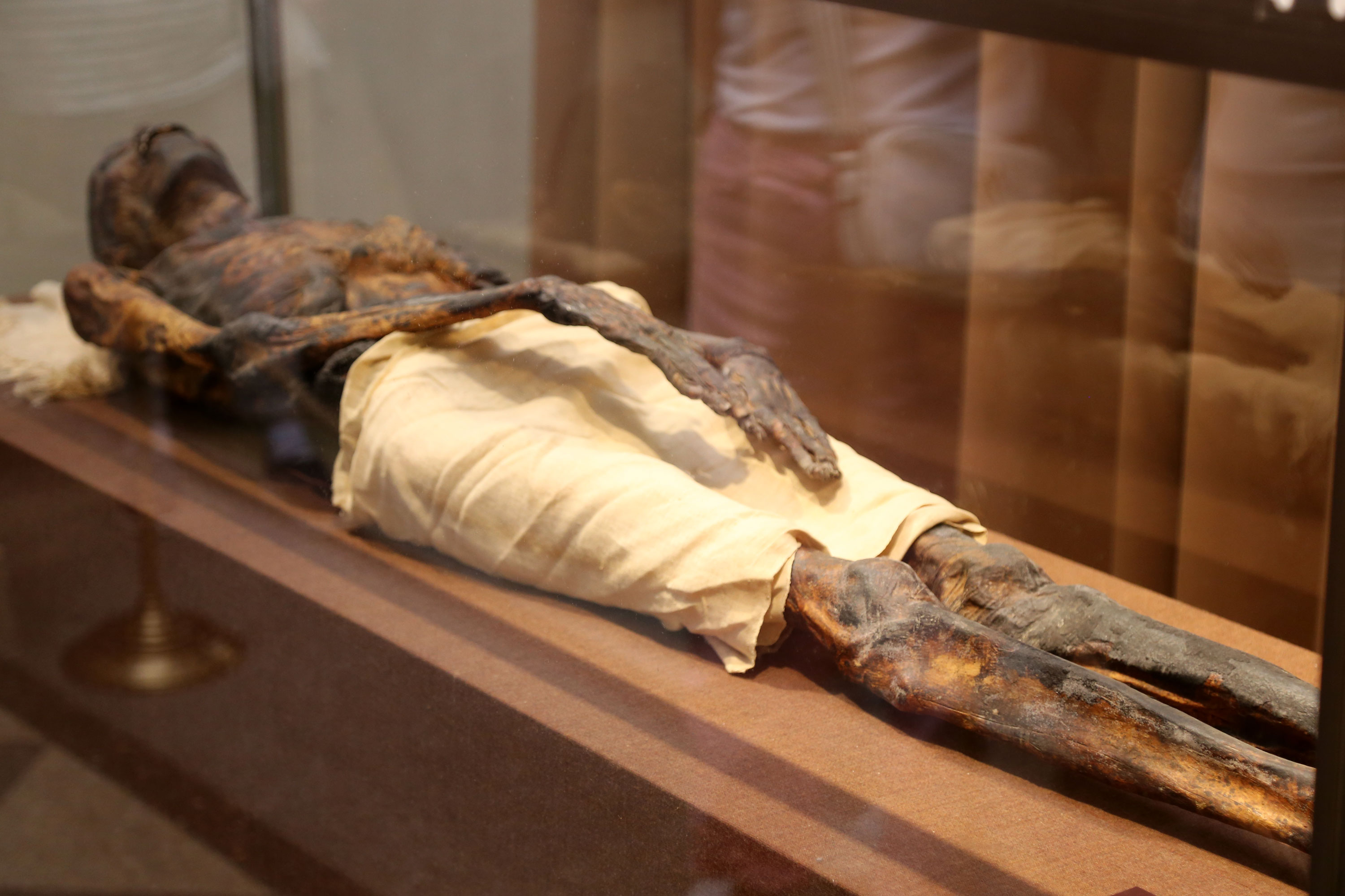

== See also ==
- Baldin Collection
- List of largest art museums
- List of most visited art museums
- List of museums in Saint Petersburg

== Sources ==
External videos
- Presentation by Geraldine Norman on The Hermitage: The Biography of a Great Museum, April 2, 1998, C-SPAN

- Frank, Christoph (2002), "Die Gemäldesammlungen Gotzkowsky, Eimbke und Stein: Zur Berliner Sammlungsgeschichte während des Siebenjährigen Krieges.", in Michael North (ed.), Kunstsammeln und Geschmack im 18. Jahrhundert (in German), Berlin: Berlin Verlag Spitz, pp. 117–194, ISBN 3-8305-0312-1
- The Hermitage Museum (2014), The Hermitage: 250 Masterworks, New York: Skira Rizzoli, ISBN 978-0-84784-209-4
- Kostenevich, Albert (1995), Hidden Treasures Revealed: Impressionist Masterpieces and Other Important French Paintings Preserved by the State Hermitage Museum, St. Petersburg, New York: Harry N. Abrams, ISBN 0-81093-432-9
- Norman, Geraldine (1997), The Hermitage; The Biography of a Great Museum, New York: Fromm International, ISBN 0-88064-190-8
- Petrakova, Anna; Lavieille, Paul (July 2025). "Ancient vases from the Adolphe Raifé collection in St Petersburg: From Mikhail Petrovich Botkin to the State Hermitage Museum". Journal of the History of Collections. 37 (2): 253–268. doi:10.1093/jhc/fhae058.
- Renne, Elizaveta (2011), Sixteenth- to Nineteenth-Century British Painting. State Hermitage Museum Catalogue, Yale: Yale University Press, ISBN 978-0-30017-046-7
