= Annacotty =

Town near Limerick City, Ireland

Annacotty Áth an Choite
- Village
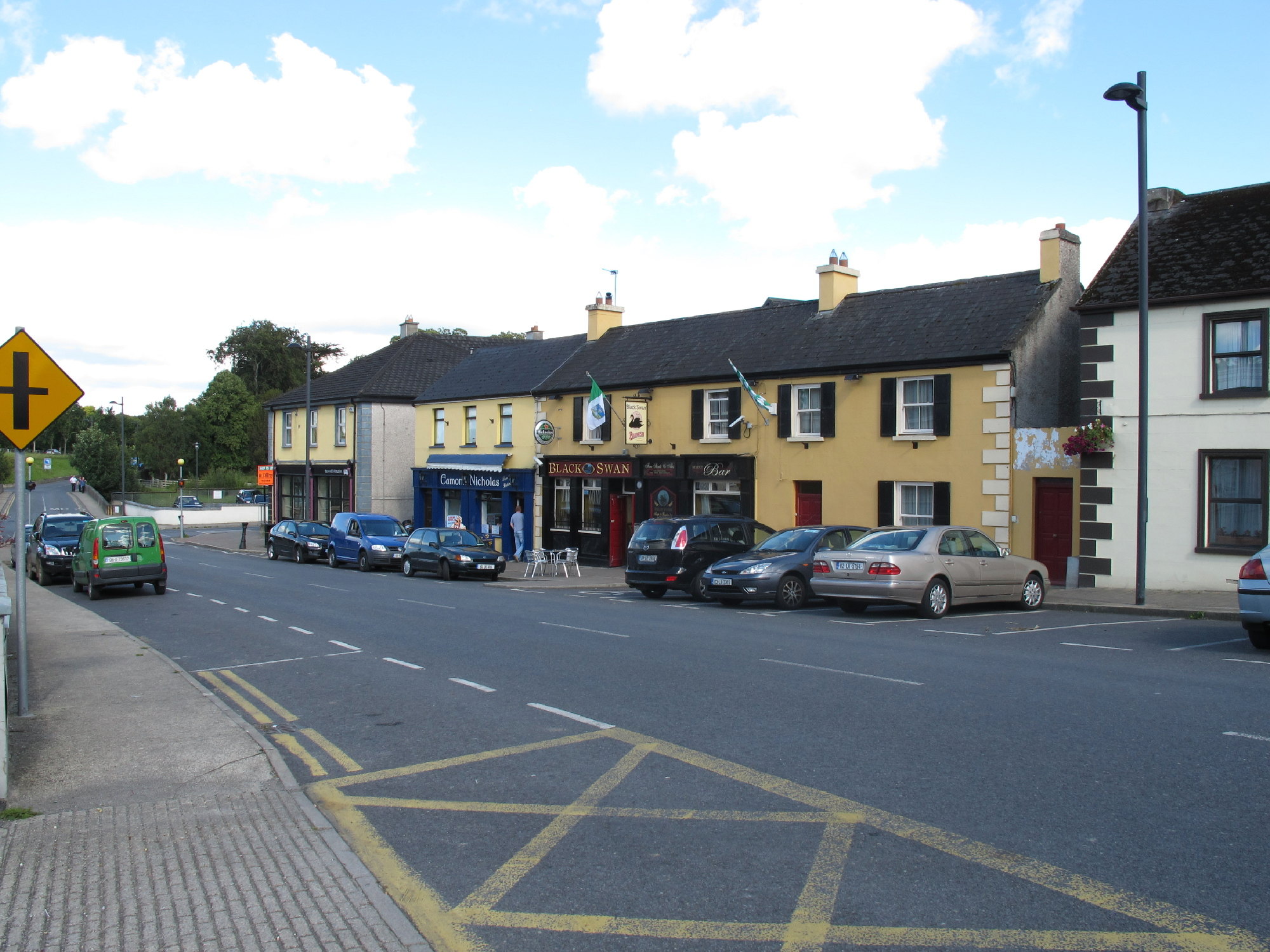
- Shops in Annacotty

- Location in Ireland
- Coordinates: 52.6689°N 8.5306°W
- Country: Ireland
- Province: Munster
- City: Limerick
- Dáil Éireann: Limerick City

Population (2016)
  - Total: 2,930
- Irish Grid Reference: R574572

Annacotty (Irish: Áth an Choite, meaning 'the ford of the small boat') is a small village on the outskirts of Limerick city, Ireland, 7 km (4 mi) from the city centre. It is situated where the old N7 main road between Limerick and Dublin crosses the Mulkear River, 1 km (0.6 mi) upstream of where it flows into the River Shannon.

== History ==
The village originally grew up around the grain mills which harnessed the water power of the River Mulkear. Clonkeen Church was established as a monastic site c. AD 600. One was beside the bridge, later restored for use as a restaurant, and the second was 1 km (0.62 mi) upstream at Ballyclough.

Annacotty Co-Operative Society was founded in the 1890s and butter was made at the creamery up to the 1960s when it was taken over by Black Abbey Co-operative of Adare (which, after a succession of mergers, became part of the Dairygold Co-op). The creamery building is now used as a retail store, Mr Price.

With the expansion of Limerick, from 1990 Annacotty was "swallowed up" into the growing suburb of Castletroy. The N7, which originally ran through the main street, bypassed the village as it was then, in 1980 when a new bridge was built over the Mulkear 100m downstream. That, in turn, was superseded by the building of the Limerick Southern Ring Road which crossed the river 1 km (0.62 mi) upstream at Ballyclough. Annacotty officially became part of Limerick City following the May 2014 local government elections with local councillors elected as part of the Limerick City Metropolitan District. Prior to this, local councillors were elected to Limerick County Council, a separate authority to the old City Council.

Annacotty Industrial Estate was built on the former site of the Ferenka factory. Opened in March 1972 by the AKZO Group to manufacture steelcord, it achieved notoriety when its Dutch managing director Tiede Herrema was kidnapped by IRA Volunteers Eddie Gallagher and Marion Coyle in October 1975 and freed four weeks later following a protracted siege in Monasterevin, County Kildare. After sustaining continuing losses and experiencing numerous industrial disputes from the day it opened, the factory closed down in December 1977 with the loss of over 1,400 full-time jobs.

Historical population
Year	Pop.	±%
1991	546	—
1996	586	+7.3%
2002	1,342	+129.0%
2006	1,839	+37.0%
2011	2,856	+55.3%
2016	2,930	+2.6%
Source: Central Statistics Office

== Sport ==
Sports clubs in the area include Aisling Annacotty, the local football club, and UL Bohemians, a local rugby club which is located on Mulkear Drive.

Annacotty is the birthplace of the Limerick inter-county hurler Jackie Power and a statue of him stands on the main street. Former Irish rugby international Peter Clohessy also comes from the town.

== Transport ==
Annacotty railway station opened on 8 August 1858, but finally closed on 9 September 1963. Private bus operator Dublin Coach operate PSO Bus Route 310 between Limerick City and nearby Newtown, in Annacotty.

== See also ==
- List of towns and villages in the Republic of Ireland
