= The Guitar Player (Vermeer) =

1672 painting by Johannes Vermeer

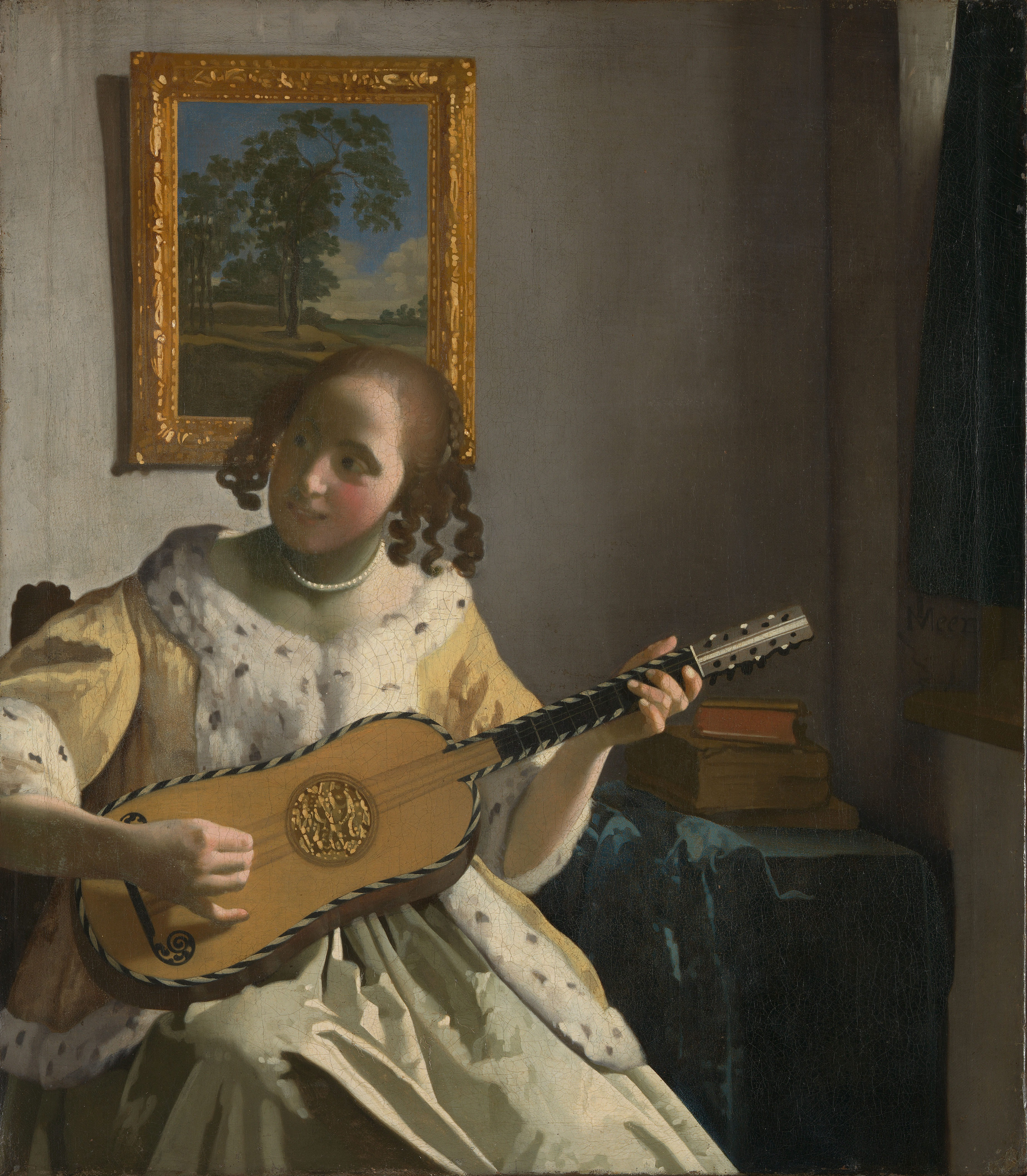
- Vermeer - The Guitar Player
- Artist: Johannes Vermeer
- Year: 1672
- Medium: oil on canvas
- Dimensions: 53 cm × 46.3 cm (21 in × 18.2 in)
- Location: Kenwood House, London

The Guitar Player is an oil painting by Dutch Golden Age artist Johannes Vermeer (1632–1675), dated c. 1672. This work of art is one of Vermeer's final artistic activities, providing insight into the techniques he mastered and approaches to painting he favoured. The painting has been on display at Kenwood House, London since the 1920s, as part of the Iveagh Bequest collection. After being recovered from a theft in 1974, when the painting was held for ransom, The Guitar Player was returned to Kenwood House.

== Background ==
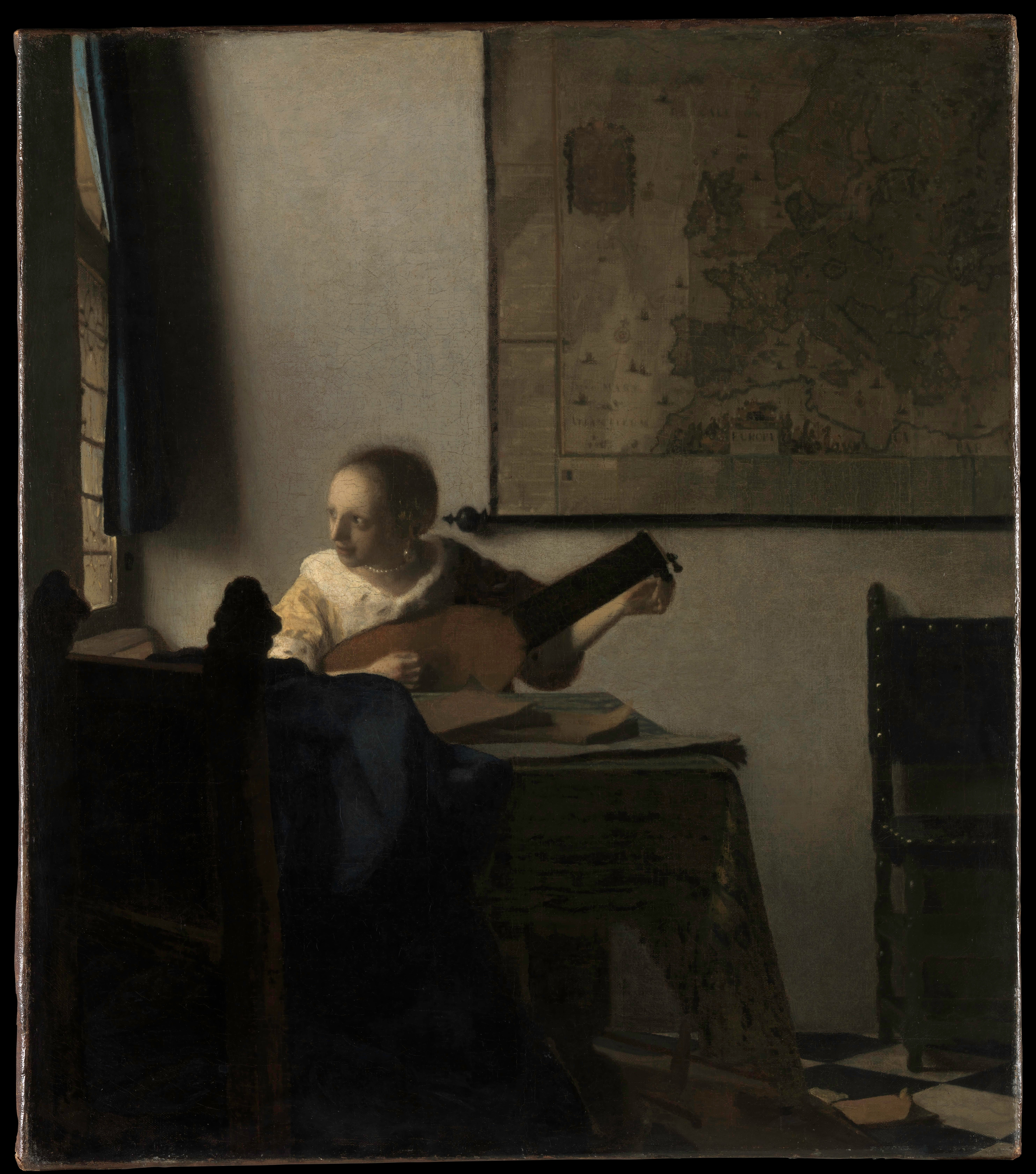
Johannes Vermeer, Woman with a Lute, 1664, oil on canvas

Vermeer's artistic style in the 1670s is often compared to his earlier style of the mid-1660s. The Guitar Player properly demonstrates the energy of Vermeer's late style. His earlier paintings portray quiet self-contained worlds, but The Guitar Player is different. His late style demonstrated abstract painting techniques, in which the depiction of motion is portrayed through the diffused illustration of shifting objects. With Vermeer's experience, he began to create paintings that demonstrate dynamic poses and actions, implying that a movement (or in this case, sound) is taking place. The Guitar Player is often compared to Vermeer's Woman with a Lute.

== Composition and style ==
The Guitar Player represents a new direction in Vermeer's art. Because he developed and perfected compositional balance and harmony during the 1660s, he was able to expand and paint scenes that show imbalance and fluctuation. Vermeer's painting of The Guitar Player rejects compositional balance and harmony, which contradicts his previous paintings. This painting exhibits an unbalanced arrangement that depicts a lack of compositional consistency, but also rejects the past instrument of the lute to focus on the modern guitar. The rejection of the lute and depiction of the guitar may be linked to Vermeer's compositional organisation. Vermeer painted the young guitar player far to the left, covering the right half of the painting in light and shadow. This imbalance gives the viewer a sense of change and movement. The combination of an uneven arrangement conjoined with a gleam of light coming from the right rather than the left, forces the viewer to engage with the character and instrument in this painting. The compositional arrangement is reinforced by Vermeer's decision to specifically direct the light onto the guitar player, which helps the viewer feel the impact of her presence. As a result of Vermeer's decision to paint a single personality, a greater importance and focus is placed on the instrument. The inclusion of a pastoral landscape, dark curtains, three books, and a blue tablecloth provide a counterbalance to the overriding composition displayed on the left of this artwork.

The late style of Vermeer utilised a number of painting techniques, most of which suggest an abstract style. His fascination with objects and actions that portray movement and sound are represented by an approach to painting that establishes objects as diffused and illuminated. In his painting, Vermeer integrated the use of abstraction through the strum of the guitar strings and movement of the right hand. Because this painting stayed with him until he died in 1675, we must assume that this was his own stylistic direction, and not a request of a patron.

== Visual analysis ==
In this painting, Vermeer depicts a young woman strumming a guitar. The instrument is placed comfortably on her lap while she plays near a window, sitting in the corner of a room. Her attire is made up of an ermine-bordered yellow jacket, an ivory-coloured satin dress, and a pearl necklace. Surrounding her is a painted pastoral landscape bordered by an extravagant picture frame, a blank wall, three books, and a guitar. Prior to this painting, Vermeer portrayed individuals with obscure expressions. However, this woman has an open expression that is joyous and flirtatious. The woman's smile and tipped head, along with the fixed gaze on something just outside the painting suggests that she is playing not for us, but for an unseen individual. Her dress and hairstyle reflect the relevant fashions of the wealthy Dutch, in that day.

The woman is portrayed with wholesome features and a free expression, as if she is in the act of speaking or singing. The joyous demeanour established in this painting is conveyed through the woman's self expression, the peaceful landscape pictured behind her, and the soft tones of light and dark. Due to these factors, Vermeer is able to provoke feelings of calmness and contentment.

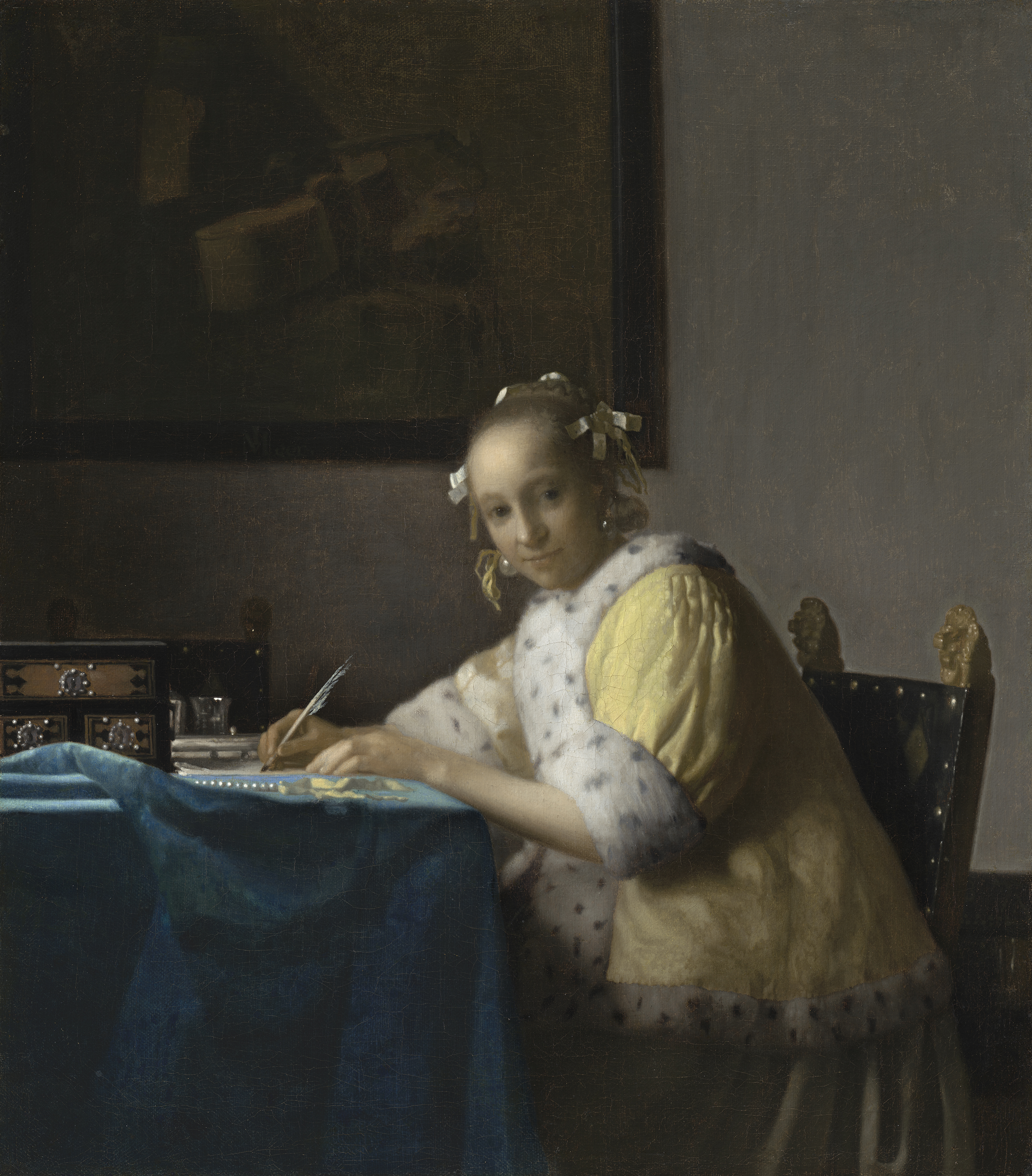
Johannes Vermeer, A Lady Writing, 1665, oil on canvas

=== Yellow jacket and satin dress ===
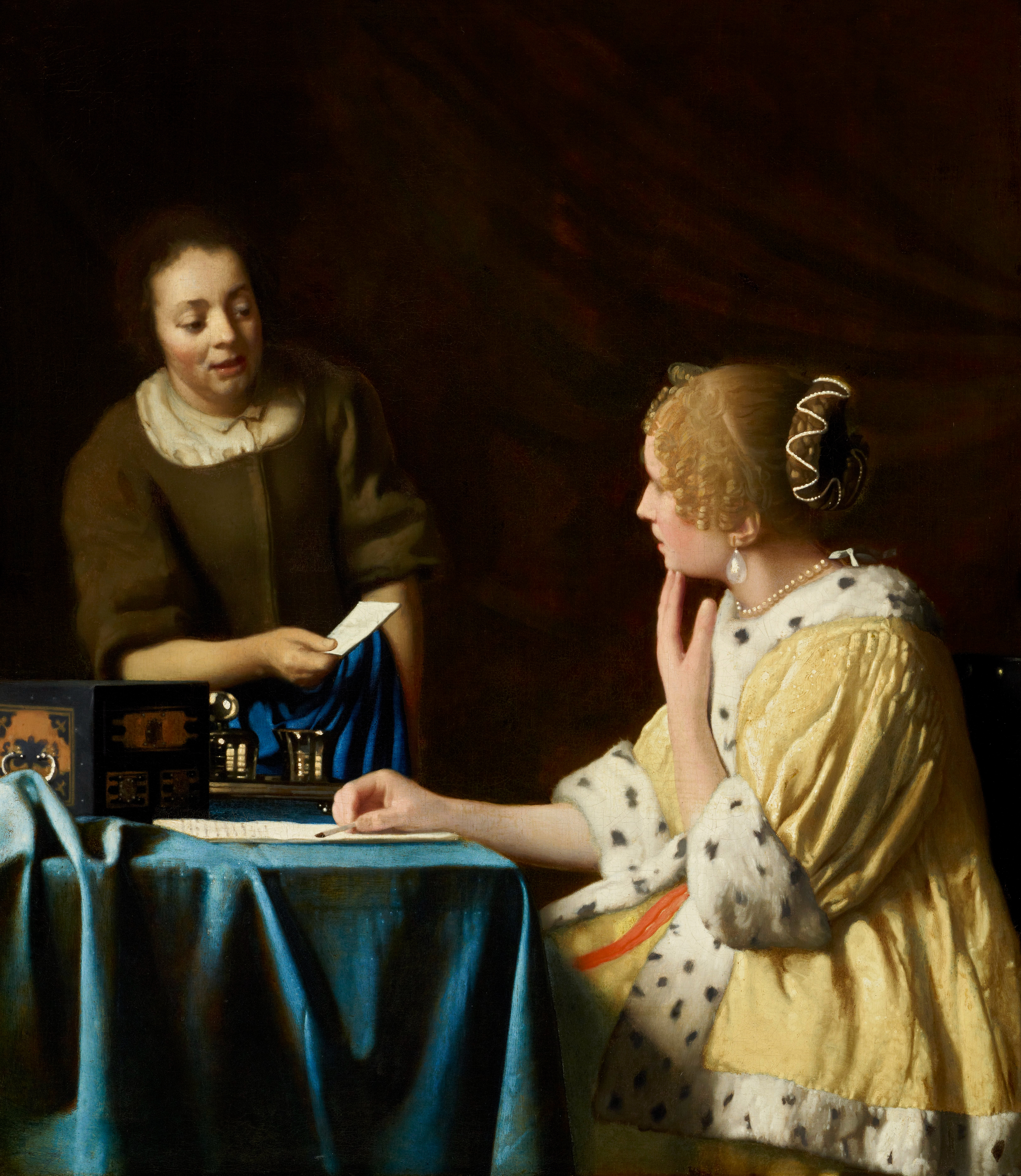
Johannes Vermeer, Mistress and Maid, 1667, oil on canvas

The morning jacket portrayed in this painting resembles five separate Vermeer paintings, three of which are A Lady Writing a Letter, Mistress and Maid, and Woman with a Pearl Necklace. In each painting, the jacket depicts different types of folds, distribution of spots, and fur trim. The thin patches of grey and yellow lead-tin paint categorise the abstract pattern that establishes the folds in the jacket's fabric and fur trim. Vermeer's devotion to painting light and shade can be acknowledged through the inclusion of dark brown shadows painted on the young musician's right arm and shoulder. From a distance these small patches seem blended, but they are actually lying side-by-side. Historians conclude that the fur on Vermeer's morning jacket was not made from ermine, but either cat, squirrel, or mouse. The fur was then decorated with faux spots. The jacket in The Guitar Player is one of the few surviving examples of 17th-century overcoats.

The depiction of a satin dress implies a life of luxury. The young woman's gown is presumably starched satin. For the dress to appear heavy and shimmery, the material was stiffened with starch and then ironed. The act of painting fine materials such as satin, took time and talent. To realistically represent luxurious materials, the artist had to be able to depict small details in the folds and patterns of the dress. To complete such a task, the artist often set up a life-sized wooden mannequin dressed in the garments.

=== Pearl necklace ===
Vermeer's depiction of a pearl necklace alludes to the young woman's elegant lifestyle. In this work he used an abstract technique to portray the pearl necklace, which was replicated in his painting, Allegory of Faith. To begin, he painted a base layer of dark greenish grey which curved around her neck to depict a shadow. Over the shadow, he created a hazy sequence of white spherical highlights. He did not define the individual pearls to portray the natural translucence of the gemstone. Compared to his paintings of the mid-1660s, Vermeer simplified and dismissed intense detail for abstracted portrayals. This shows an outgrowth of his own style, along with a technique that was not used frequently by artists of his time.

=== Guitar ===
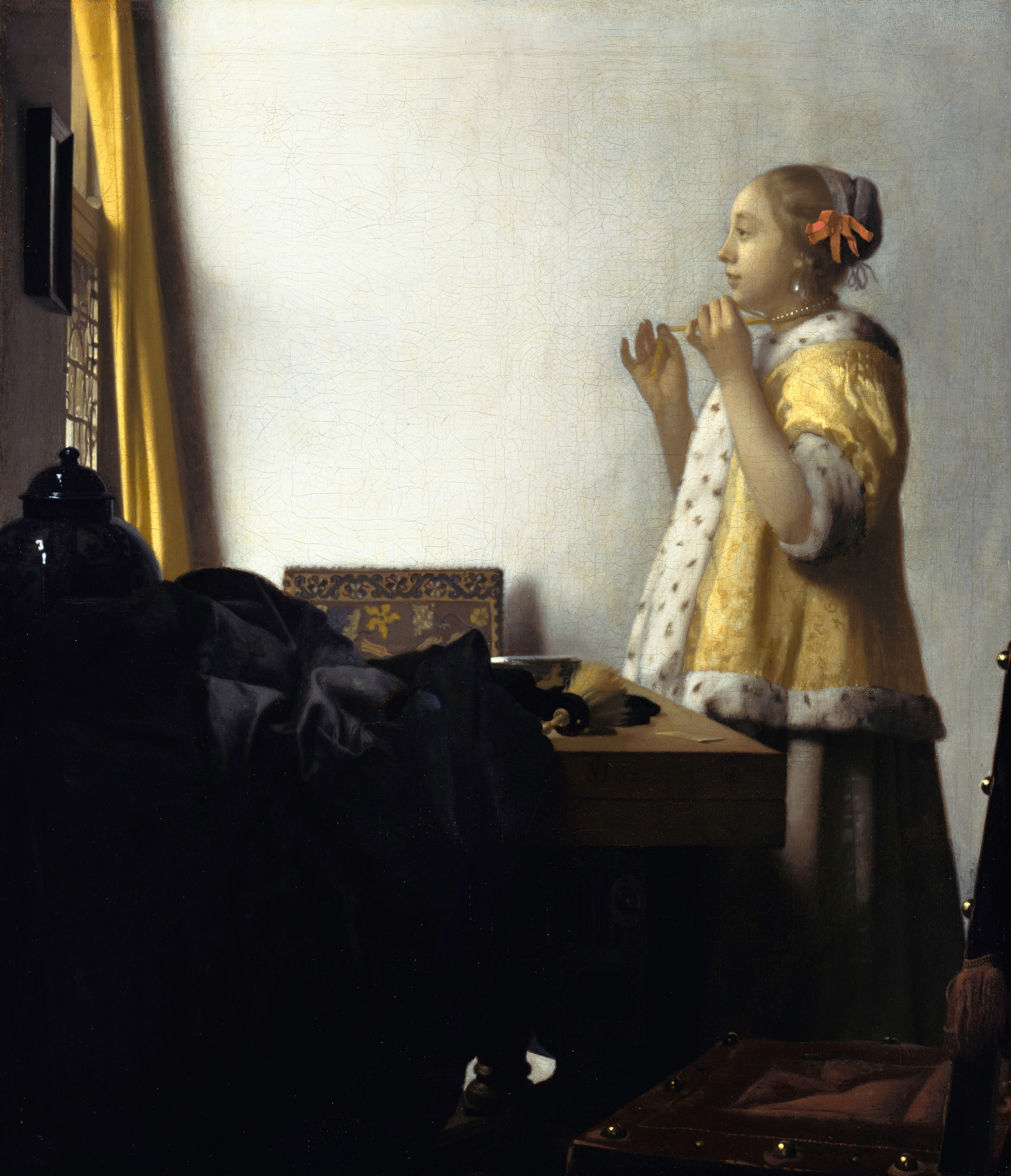
Johannes Vermeer, Woman with a Pearl Necklace, 1665, oil on canvas

Vermeer's depiction of a young woman making music is associated with the nobility found in artistic inspiration, as well as the art of painting in the 17th century. The guitar originated in Spain, and was keenly sought after in the Dutch Republic. Compared to the lute, the guitar was cheaper and easier to play. This instrument has been decorated with a combination of ivory, ebony, tortoiseshell, and mother-of-pearl. The soundhole is created with multiple layers of ornately scrolled paper. In the 17th century, the guitar was used as both a continuo (harmonic) instrument, and a solo instrument. The music the guitar produces is bolder than that of the lute, and this is due to the design of the cords. The guitar's strings reverberate more deeply and fully than that of past instruments. It does not play as loudly as the modern flamenco guitar, and the gut strings are played with fingers. This painting depicts a five-course guitar, which was standard for most solo musicians.

Vermeer's depiction of a guitar suggests a move into the modern world of music, in which the lute is left behind with its contemplative and conservative traditions. The depiction of this guitar was created with immense attention to detail. The sound hole is created with a depiction of a finely tooled gold rose, where Vermeer has created an abstract arrangement of painted strokes. These strokes are highlighted with hazy accents of lead-tin yellow paint. The decorative white and black trim of the guitar's border intensifies the painting's cheerful atmosphere. The small detailed sound hole was created with blobs of impasto paint, which portray the light reflecting across its slick uneven surface. The most influential and well thought out technique Vermeer used in this painting focuses on the guitar's strings. Some of the strings are blurred; this suggests that they have been strummed and are vibrating. Because of this, we can assume she is in the midst of playing a song.

=== Landscape painting ===
Vermeer's picture-within-a-picture was identified by art historian Gregor Weber. The landscape that is depicted behind the young woman's head is identified with Pieter Jansz's, A Wooded Landscape with a Gentleman and Dogs in the Foreground. In Vermeer's version, the mimicked composition is cropped slightly on top, and on the right. The head of the young musician covers the gentleman and dogs. Vermeer's version guides the viewer's focus towards the central tree, as well as incorporating blue skies and greener foliage.

Vermeer may have incorporated this sun-filled pastoral landscape into his painting in reference to woman's beauty. Artists in the 17th century were often attributing the topic of female beauty to nature, which was frequently expressed through poetry and music.

=== Wall ===
Vermeer's depiction of a whitewashed wall allowed him to set the stage for a scene that illustrates an individual strumming a guitar composed on the left side of the canvas. The painting's composition is balanced due to the large negative space the wall creates. The unobtrusive wall helps establish the mood of the painting, as well as the lighting scheme and spatial depth. Because of the wall's colour, Vermeer was able to establish a warm and welcoming temperature from the incoming light. Vermeer's brushwork also implies the light's direction.

According to the Delft building historian Wim Weeve, the use of whitewashed walls was frequently integrated in the houses, castles, and churches of the Dutch in the Middle Ages. The beginning process of whitewashing a wall starts with a thick application of lime putty, which is created with burned seashells. When the putty dries, and the wall is thick enough, then the process of whitewashing with paint can begin.

=== Chair ===
This wooden chair is portrayed several times through Vermeer's artistic career. At the top left hand side of the painting, behind her shoulder, a silhouette of a lion head finial can be found. This finial references chairs designed and crafted by the Spanish. When constructing this chair, the Spanish craftsman used leather and not cloth, due to Spain's constant supply of rawhide. These chairs were respected for their craftsmanship and creativity, and the creators of these chairs regarded themselves as superior within the craftsman guilds.

=== Books ===
Vermeer's decision to depict three books suggests the young woman's sophistication, which is implied through a high level of education. Even though scholars do not know the book titles, it has been argued that the middle book's bulkiness resembles the Bible, and it has been stated that the possible representation of the Bible implies biblical advice. If this is true, then the painting could indicate a decision to morally ignore the religious text. The woman's body language and facial expression turn away from the book to pay attention to the individual on her right. Others argue that the presence of the book implies learning, which is familiar in Dutch paintings of the Middle Ages. According to scholar Elise Goodman, the young musician featured in this painting would be a member of the haute bourgeoisie who could read, write, and speak several languages.

== Provenance ==
After Vermeer's death in 1675, the painting stayed in Delft in the hands of Maria de Knuijt, his widow. In 1682, Maria gave the painting to their daughter, Magdalena van Ruijven. After Magdalena's death, the painting was passed on to her widower, Jacob Abrahamsz Dissius, in 1695. On 16 May 1696, the painting was auctioned at a Dissius sale in Amsterdam. From 1794 to 1802, The Guitar Player was in the hands of Henry Temple, 2nd Viscount Palmerston, in London. From 1802 to 1865, the painting was owned by Temple's son, Henry John Temple, 3rd Viscount Palmerston. Eventually, the painting was in the ownership of John Temple's step-son, William Francis Cowper-Temple, 1st Baron Mount Temple, from 1865 to 1888. In 1888, his stepson, Evelyn Melbourne Ashley, sold the painting to Thomas Agnew and Sons, in London. Between 1888 and 1889, the painting was sold by the Agnews to Edward Guinness. From 1889 to 1927, the painting was in the hands of Edward Guinness, 1st Earl of Iveagh, in London. Much of his collection of paintings, including The Guitar Player, was donated to the nation after his death in 1927 as the Iveagh Bequest, housed at Kenwood House, Hampstead, north London.

In 2012, Kenwood House closed for renovations. While construction was taking place, the painting was on display in the National Gallery beside the gallery's own two Vermeers. In 2013, The painting was returned in late December when construction was over. The Guitar Player is currently on display in Kenwood House.

=== Theft ===
On 23 February 1974, the painting was stolen from Kenwood House and held for ransom in a proposed deal to deliver and distribute over $1 million (US) dollars in food to the Caribbean island of Grenada. The thief threatened to destroy the painting otherwise. Following the threat, a small strip of the painting was sent to The Times in London, along with another demand that requested the Irish Republican sisters Marian and Dolours Price be allowed to serve their prison sentences near their homes in Northern Ireland. It was recovered by Scotland Yard in the cemetery of St Bartholomew-the-Great, in London's financial district, on 7 May 1974. The painting showed signs of dampness but was otherwise undamaged.

=== Copy ===
A period copy, A Lady Playing the Guitar, is in the collection of the Philadelphia Museum of Art. Recent scholarship, as of June 2023, suggests the painting in the Philadelphia museum may be a copy of the Kenwood original by Vermeer himself. The two paintings were exhibited at Kenwood House between September 2025 and January 2026, displayed side by side for the first time in over 300 years.

== See also ==
- List of paintings by Johannes Vermeer
