= Rose Dugdale =

Irish Republican Army member (1941–2024)

- Dugdale in 1974
- Born: Bridget Rose Dugdale; 25 March 1941; Honiton, Devon, England
- Died: 18 March 2024 (aged 82); Dublin, Ireland
- Education: St Anne's College, Oxford (BA); Mount Holyoke College (MA); University of London (PhD)
- Occupation: Economist
- Organisation: Provisional IRA
- Criminal penalty: 9 years' imprisonment
- Spouse: Eddie Gallagher (m. 1978)
- Children: 1

Bridget Rose Dugdale (25 March 1941 – 18 March 2024) was an English debutante who rebelled against her wealthy upbringing, becoming a volunteer in the militant Irish republican organisation, the Provisional Irish Republican Army (IRA). As an IRA member, she took part in the theft of paintings worth IR£8 million, a bomb attack on a Royal Ulster Constabulary (RUC) station using a hijacked helicopter, and developed a rocket launcher and an explosive.

== Early life and education ==
Dugdale was born into a wealthy English family on 25 March 1941. Her millionaire father was a former officer and an underwriter at Lloyd's of London who owned Yarty Farm, a 600-acre (2.4 km^{2}) estate at Membury near Axminster in Devon. Her mother, Caroline Edith Sutton "Carol" Mosley (née Timmis), was firstly married to John Arthur Noel Mosley with whom she had two sons, Dugdale's elder half-brothers, Timothy John Oswald Mosley and Simon James Mosley.

The Dugdales also owned a house in London, near Chelsea Hospital and Dugdale was educated at the nearby Miss Ironside's School for Girls in Kensington, west London. She was a popular pupil, with fellow pupil Virginia Ironside stating: "Everyone adored this generous, clever and dashing millionaire's daughter, who was life and laughter". After completing her early education Dugdale was sent abroad to attend a finishing school. Then, in 1958, she was presented as a debutante at the start of the social season. Her debutante ball was held in 1959, with Dugdale describing it as "one of those pornographic affairs which cost about what 60 old-age pensioners receive in six months".

Later in 1959, Dugdale began reading philosophy, politics and economics at St Anne's College, University of Oxford. While studying there, she began what newspapers would later describe as a "lunge to the left", when she and Jenny Grove, a fellow student, gatecrashed the Oxford Union wearing wigs and men's clothing in protest at the Union's refusal to admit women undergraduates as members, encouraged from the gallery by another student, Sarah Caudwell. After completing her studies at Oxford, she travelled to the United States attending Mount Holyoke College in South Hadley, Massachusetts, where she obtained a master's degree in philosophy, submitting a thesis on Ludwig Wittgenstein. She also studied at the University of London, obtaining a PhD in economics.

== Early political activity ==
By the early 1970s, Dugdale had become politically radicalised due to the 1968 student protests, and she had also been inspired after visiting Cuba. By 1972, she had devoted herself to helping the poor, after resigning from her job as an economist for the government, selling her house in Chelsea, and moving into a flat in Tottenham with her lover, Walter Heaton, who described himself as a "revolutionary socialist". Heaton was a court-martialled former guardsman and militant shop steward who was married with two daughters, and had been imprisoned for several minor criminal offences including burglary, obstructing the police and fraudulent consumption of electricity. Dugdale cashed in her share of the family syndicate at Lloyd's, estimated to be £150,000, and distributed the money to poor people in north London. The couple had an interest in the Northern Ireland civil rights movement, and together ran the Tottenham Claimants Union from a corner shop. They took frequent trips to Northern Irish cities to participate in demonstrations organized by the IRA, and came into contact with the group's militant arm.

In June 1973, the couple were arrested for committing a burglary at the Dugdale family home in Devon. Paintings and silverware valued at £82,000 were stolen, and police believe the proceeds were destined to be sent to the IRA by Heaton. At their trial at Exeter Crown Court, Dugdale assumed responsibility for her own defense and claimed to have been coerced; she pleaded not guilty and then spent the rest of the trial publicly denouncing her family and background. Her father appeared as a witness for the prosecution and was cross-examined by Dugdale, who said to him: "I love you, but hate everything you stand for". The couple were found guilty, prompting Dugdale to address the jury: "In finding me guilty you have turned me from an intellectual recalcitrant into a freedom fighter. I know no finer title". Heaton was sentenced to six years' imprisonment. By contrast, Dugdale received only a two-year suspended sentence as the judge considered the risk of her committing any further criminal acts to be "extremely remote".

== IRA activity ==
In the months following the trial, Dugdale travelled to Ireland and formally joined an IRA active service unit operating along the border between Northern Ireland and the Republic of Ireland. In January 1974, Dugdale and several fellow IRA members, including Eddie Gallagher, hijacked a helicopter in County Donegal in the Republic of Ireland. Dugdale and Gallagher then used the helicopter to drop improvised bombs in milk churns on the RUC station in Strabane in Northern Ireland, the first helicopter bombing raid in the history of the British Isles. Dugdale in later life, when asked what the best day in her life had been, said that it was the day of the Strabane attack. The bombs failed to explode, and Dugdale became wanted for questioning regarding the bombing with her picture in police stations across Britain and Ireland. A warrant was subsequently issued for her arrest by Manchester Magistrates Court on 23 February 1974 on charges of conspiring to smuggle arms.

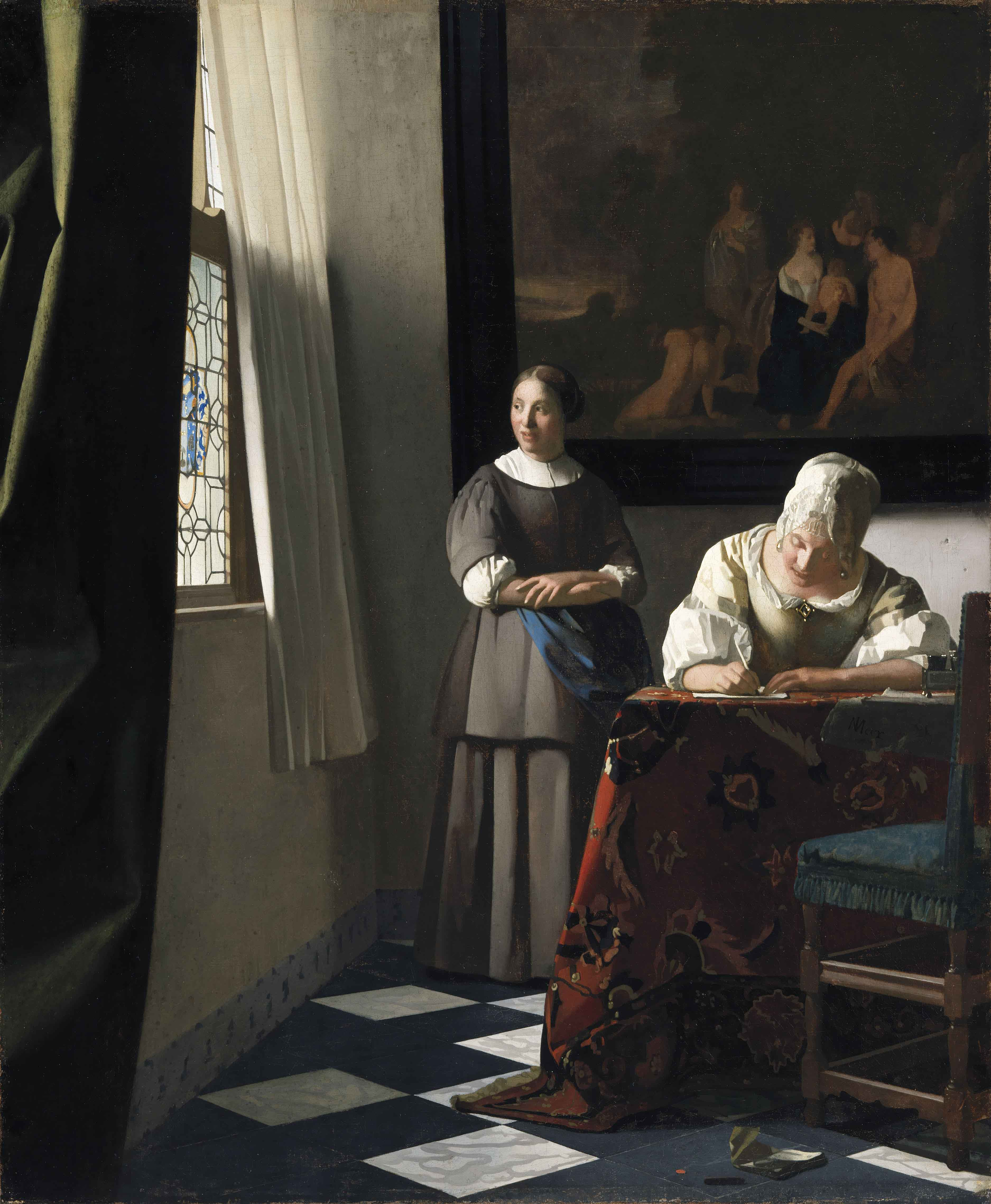
Vermeer's Lady Writing a Letter with her Maid, stolen in the 1974 raid

On 26 April 1974, Dugdale took part in a raid on Russborough House in County Wicklow, the home of Sir Alfred Beit, 2nd Baronet. Dugdale and three other IRA members forced their way into the house, and pistol-whipped Beit and his wife before tying and gagging the couple.

The IRA members then stole nineteen old master paintings valued at IR£8 million, including works by Gainsborough, Rubens, Vermeer and Goya. The Vermeer taken was Lady Writing a Letter with her Maid, one of only two Vermeers in private ownership, the other being at Buckingham Palace. The IRA sent a ransom note offering to exchange the stolen paintings for IR£500,000 and the release of Dolours and Marian Price, two sisters convicted of IRA bombings who were on hunger strike in Brixton Prison attempting to secure repatriation to Ireland. The Gardaí started a nationwide hunt for the paintings, and on 4 May they raided a house rented by Dugdale in Glandore, County Cork, and discovered all nineteen paintings in the boot of a car. Dugdale was arrested under Section 30 of the Offences against the State Act, and the next day she was charged in relation to both the helicopter attack and the art theft.

As at her previous trial in 1973, Dugdale used the courtroom as a political platform, shouting "The British have an army of occupation in a small part of Ireland—but not for long!" during her arraignment in Dublin. Dugdale's father issued a statement saying: "I don't want to appear hardhearted, but I've done everything I can for her. She knows perfectly well she could turn to me if she wanted to." In Dugdale's submission to the court during her trial she denounced Britain as "a filthy enemy" and stated the Dublin government was guilty of "treacherous collaboration" with England. On 25 June 1974, she was sentenced to nine years' imprisonment after pleading "proudly and incorruptibly guilty", and she gave a clenched fist salute to supporters in the public gallery.

== Imprisonment ==
Dugdale was pregnant with Eddie Gallagher's child when she was imprisoned, and on 12 December 1974, she gave birth to a son, Ruairí, in Limerick Prison. On 3 October 1975, Gallagher and fellow IRA member Marion Coyle kidnapped industrialist Tiede Herrema near his home in Castletroy, a suburb of Limerick. They were traced to a house in Monasterevin, County Kildare, and a two-week siege began. Coyle and Gallagher had demanded the release of Dugdale and two other IRA members, but the authorities refused to grant any concessions.

The siege ended on 7 November when Herrema was released, and Coyle and Gallagher were arrested. Gallagher and Coyle were sentenced to twenty years' and fifteen years' imprisonment respectively, and in 1978, Gallagher and Dugdale received special dispensation to marry. The wedding took place on 24 January 1978 inside Limerick Prison, and was the first wedding between convicted prisoners in the history of the Republic of Ireland. Dugdale was released from prison in October 1980.

== Later life ==
After her release from prison, Dugdale was active in the public campaign started in support of protesting Irish republican prisoners during the 1981 Irish hunger strike. She was also a veteran activist in the political party Sinn Féin, which had links to the IRA.

To avoid further police attention, Dugdale turned her focus to manufacturing equipment for IRA attacks. From the mid-1980s to the early 2000s (when the IRA formally renounced violence), she and her colleague Jim Monaghan developed a variety of home-made weapons and bombs that could be cheaply fashioned from materials obtained from consumer shops or smuggled in through imports. One was called the "biscuit launcher", which was used several times by the IRA. Using readily available parts, it fired armour-piercing missiles packed with semtex explosive, using packets of digestive biscuits to absorb the recoil. Dugdale and Monaghan also developed a new type of explosive used in the Glenanne barracks bombing in May 1991, and in a large bomb that destroyed the Baltic Exchange in the City of London in 1992.

In 2007, she spoke out in support of the Shell to Sea campaign against the proposed construction of a high-pressure raw gas pipeline through Rossport by Shell, saying the Shell contract was invalid and needed "to be renegotiated on behalf of the people of Ireland". Later in life, Dugdale became a managing director at Dublin Community Television and kept the job until her retirement.

In 2011, she was the honouree at the annual Dublin Volunteers event, which each year acknowledges a person for their contribution to Irish republicanism. In an interview with the republican newspaper An Phoblacht before the event, Dugdale said she believed "the revolutionary army that was the IRA had achieved its principal objective, which was to get your enemy to negotiate with you. They did that with amazing skill and ability, and I can't help but respect what was done in terms of the Good Friday Agreement." On her involvement in the IRA, she added: "I did what I wanted to do. I am proud to have been part of the Republican Movement, and I hope that I have played my very small part in the success of the armed struggle."

Until her death, Dugdale lived in a care home in Dublin run by the Poor Servants of the Mother of God, most of whose residents are retired nuns. She died there on 18 March 2024, at the age of 82.

== In popular culture ==
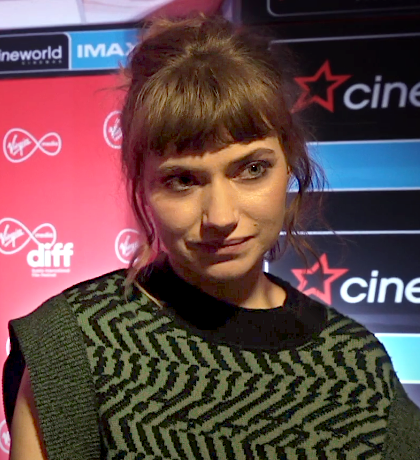
Imogen Poots portrayed Dugdale in the 2024 film Baltimore

In 2012, she was the subject of a TG4 documentary entitled Mná an IRA (Women of the IRA). A biography of Dugdale by Sean O'Driscoll, Heiress, Rebel, Vigilante, Bomber: The Extraordinary Life of Rose Dugdale, was published in 2022. A 2023 film, Baltimore (titled Rose's War in the United States and Germany), focussing on Dugdale's role in the 1974 art raid on Russborough House, and starring Imogen Poots as Dugdale, was released in March 2024.
