= Baltimore (film) =

2023 film by Joe Lawlor and Christine Molloy

- UK theatrical release poster
- Directed by: Joe Lawlor; Christine Molloy
- Written by: Joe Lawlor; Christine Molloy
- Produced by: David Collins; Joe Lawlor
- Starring: Imogen Poots
- Cinematography: Tom Comerford
- Edited by: Joe Lawlor; Christine Molloy
- Music by: Stephen McKeon
- Production companies: Desperate Optimists; Samson Films
- Distributed by: Bankside Films
- Release dates: 1 September 2023 (Telluride); 22 March 2024 (United Kingdom)
- Running time: 98 minutes
- Countries: Ireland; United Kingdom
- Language: English
- Box office: $418,056

Baltimore (released as Rose's War in the United States and Germany) is a 2023 thriller film written and directed by Joe Lawlor and Christine Molloy. It is based on the life of Rose Dugdale, a British heiress-turned-IRA member, played by Imogen Poots. The film is an international co-production between Ireland and the United Kingdom. Its title refers to the village of Baltimore in County Cork.

Baltimore premiered at the 50th Telluride Film Festival on 1 September 2023 and was released in the United Kingdom and Ireland on 22 March 2024.

== Plot ==
On 26 April 1974, 19 paintings were stolen from Russborough House in Ireland in the largest art heist in history. The gang, led by Rose Dugdale, demanded the release of four IRA prisoners from England in exchange for the artworks. The film interweaves the heist with flashbacks to Rose’s childhood, education, and radicalization.

In her youth, Rose grows up in a privileged English family. She experiences discomfort at her first fox hunt in 1951 and is moved by Diego Velázquez’s The Kitchen Maid in 1957 which she says moves her deeply. At Oxford University, Rose attends a women’s rights group and becomes increasingly aware of systemic sexism and the value of direct action. By the early 1970s, she is active in anti-imperialist and squatter movements focused on supporting Irish republicanism, when she is approached by an IRA contact who trains her in using weapons and bomb-building.

During the heist Rose, wearing a red wig and speaking in a French accent, gains access to Russborough House while her IRA accomplices—Dominic, Martin, and Eddie—violently restrain the occupants at gunpoint. While stealing paintings, Rose takes care of a scared young boy. Later she is attacked by a chef who cuts her hand before being subdued. The chef is revealed to be the young boy's father. She reassures the boy and they discuss one of the paintings, Vermeer’s Lady Writing a Letter with her Maid, where Rose drops her fake accent to say she imagines the maid dreaming of a life where she isn't a maid. After the heist Rose, Dominic and Martin transport the stolen artworks to a nearby rented cottage safehouse while Rose's lover Eddie heads to a second Baltimore safehouse. In the cottage they watch news coverage, discuss the monetary and political value of the artworks, and prepare a demand letter threatening to destroy the paintings unless their conditions are met.

Throughout the safehouse sequences, Rose reveals she is pregnant but hasn't told Eddie and has violent dreams about the heist. She uses the telephone in a nearby pub to call the National Gallery of Ireland to read her demand letter, but is suspicious when the owner sees Rose's bandaged hand. On the way back she has an encounter with local farmer Donal, whose daughter's cottage Rose is renting. Paranoid, Rose sends Dominic and Martin to the Baltimore safehouse and in a final call to Eddie, chooses not to tell him she is pregnant. In a dream, she tells the owners of Russborough House she has grown fond of the stolen paintings. She confronts Donal in his home, but chooses not to kill him after he reveals he is losing his eyesight. Donal agrees to lend Rose his car and on the drive back Rose accidentally hits a fox, gravely injuring it. She shoots it dead.

A police officer visits Donal who sends him to the cottage safehouse, where he finds Rose and asks her questions before leaving. Concerned, Rose asks a local fisherman if she can pay him to take her by boat to Baltimore and he agrees. She packs up the paintings and drives to the water, telling her unborn child she's thinking of settling down after this. Suddenly many armed police approach the car. Rose tries to escape on the boat with one of the paintings, but the motor won't start and she is arrested. From the back of a police car she imagines a version of herself walking through the police, taking Lady Writing a Letter with her Maid to the boat and sailing away.

We are informed that Rose Dugdale received a nine-year prison sentence and gave birth in Limerick Prison in 1974. Eddie received a 20-year sentence for kidnapping a businessman in 1975 to try to release Rose. "Dominic" and "Martin" were never identified. Some of the stolen paintings including Lady Writing a Letter with her Maid were later donated to the National Gallery of Ireland.

== Cast ==
- Imogen Poots as Rose Dugdale
- Jude McClean as young Rose
- Jack Meade as Eddie Gallagher
- Tom Vaughan-Lawlor as Dominic
- Lewis Brophy as Martin
- Patrick Martins as Walter
- Dermot Crowley as Donal
- John Kavanagh as Sir Alfred Beit
- Andrea Irvine as Lady Beit
- Flynn Gray as Patrick
- Martha Breen as Sophie
- Carrie Crowley as Rose's Mother
- Simon Coury as Rose's Father
- Vanessa Ifediora as Alice
- Molly Rose Lawlor as Lizzie
- Ciaran McKenna as Albert Price

== Release ==
Baltimore was released on video on demand on 1 March 2024, followed by a theatrical release in the United Kingdom and Ireland on 22 March 2024.

== Reception ==
=== Box office ===
During its opening weekend, the film grossed $65,281 from 61 cinemas in the United Kingdom and $36,773 from 26 cinemas in Ireland.

=== Critical response ===
On the review aggregator website Rotten Tomatoes, 88% of 24 critics' reviews are positive, with an average rating of 7.2/10.

Wendy Ide of The Observer gave the film four out of five stars, calling it "a pleasingly taut heist movie" and "a fascinating psychological study of fanaticism, with [Imogen] Poots's expressive performance unpeeling the layers beneath [Rose] Dugdale's fervent belief in her cause. Kevin Maher of The Times awarded the movie four stars out of five, praising the film as "an impressionistic and sometimes dreamlike account of someone finding meaning in a hopeless world while remaining blind to its enormous human cost."

Wilson Chapman of IndieWire commended Imogen Poots's performance, writing that "Baltimore ultimately hinges on Poots to do most of the heavy work, and the consistently great actor is magnetic in the role, nervy and vulnerable but with a clear-eyed belief in her own convictions that makes her pop off the screen. If the movie isn't ever quite able to inspire the same devotion from the audience that Rose Dugdale has for her cause, watching a protagonist as compelling as her still makes for a thrilling 90 minutes and change." Rodrigo Perez of The Playlist echoed these sentiments, writing that "Poots is riveting as a revolutionary, and the drama knows how to pitch the escalation of intensity, but Baltimore and its sense of guilt and conscience is too obscure to affect the average viewer."
