= A Lady Playing the Guitar =

Copy of a painting by Johannes Vermeer

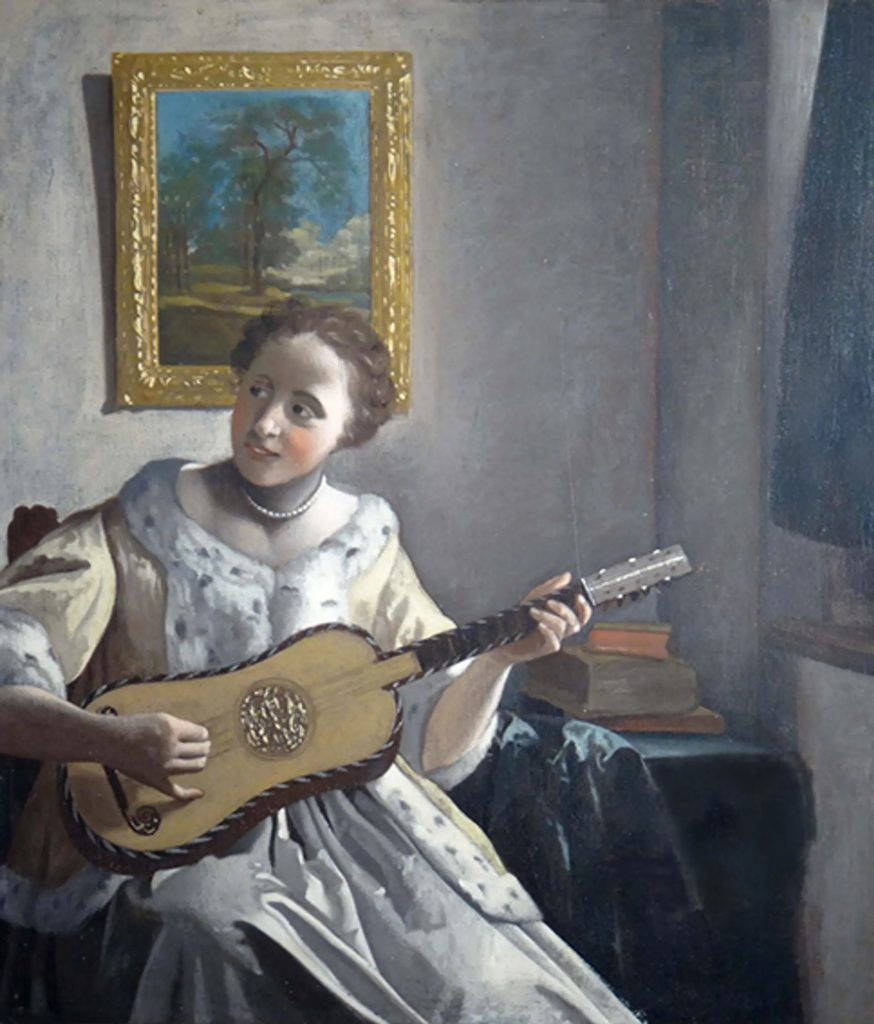
- Artist: Unknown after a work by Johannes Vermeer
- Year: after 1670s
- Dimensions: 52.5 cm × 45.6 cm (20.7 in × 18.0 in)
- Location: Philadelphia Museum of Art, Philadelphia

A Lady Playing the Guitar (after 1670s) is an oil on canvas painting by an unknown copyist after a c. 1672 work by the Dutch painter Johannes Vermeer. It is an example of Dutch Golden Age painting and is part of the collection of the Philadelphia Museum of Art.

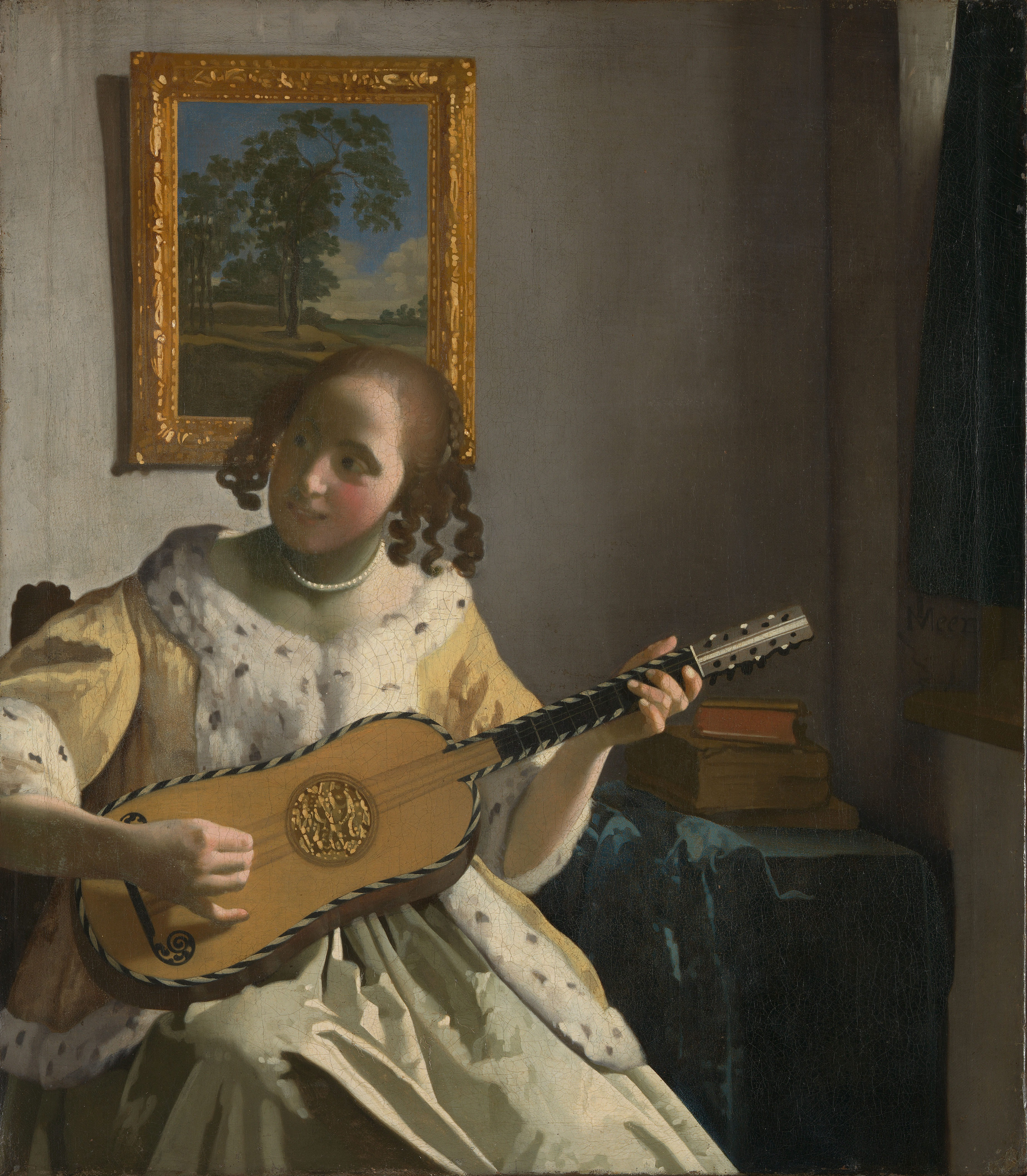
The Guitar Player, c. 1672 original in Kenwood House

== Provenance ==
This painting by a follower of Vermeer was documented as authentic by Hofstede de Groot in 1908:

26. A LADY PLAYING THE GUITAR. B. 28. H. 31.

A young lady with fresh red cheeks, wearing a white silk dress and a yellow jacket trimmed with ermine, sits on the left facing the spectator. Her figure is seen at three-quarter length. She looks with a smile at something above her to the left. Behind her is a table with a blue cloth, on which are several books. On the wall hangs a landscape. The scene is lighted from a window with a dark blue curtain on the right. The colours are delicately harmonised. The paint is thin. This picture belongs to about the same period as the National Gallery picture (23). Signed in full; canvas, 19 1/2 inches by 16 1/2 inches. Exhibited at the Royal Academy Winter Exhibition, 1892, No. 46.

The picture was, after Vermeer's death in 1676, in the possession of his widow, Catharina Bolnes; this picture, and "The Love Letter" in the Beit collection (35), were given as security for a debt of 617 florins.

Sales. Amsterdam, May 16, 1696, No. 4 (70 florins). Ph. van der Schley and D. du Pre, Amsterdam, December 22, 1817, No. 62 (65 florins 5, Coclers). In the possession of the dealer Gruyter, Amsterdam. In the collections of J. H. C. Cremer, Brussels measuring, according to Bürger, 21 inches by 18 inches; of Lord Iveagh; of Henry Bischoffsheim, London. In the possession of the dealer Gooden, London, 1896.

Now in the collection of John G. Johnson, Philadelphia.

Years later it became apparent that Hofstede de Groot (and John G. Johnson) had been tricked and this was a copy of the version in Kenwood House. It is thanks to Johnson's deeply founded interest in art that all paintings of dubious attribution in his possession, such as this one, were allowed to remain in the collection, where it has become a quiet testament to the "Vermeer craze" at the turn of the 20th century. Even after seeing the Kenwood House version, Hofstede de Groot was convinced of this painting's superiority, which demonstrates the skill of the unknown copyist. The provenance records mentioned by Hofstede de Groot pertain, however, to the Kenwood House version. It is still unknown where the dealer Stephen Gooden acquired the painting.

In 2023, during the Rijksmuseum Vermeer exhibition, the painting was presented during a symposium by Arie Wallert as a possible work by the master based on modern paint analysis. Research suggests that over-cleaning of the surface has led to a heavily abraded surface that thus far has stood in the way of such an attribution.

The two paintings were exhibited at Kenwood House between September 2025 and January 2026, displayed side by side for the first time in over 300 years.

== See also ==
- The Guitar Player (Vermeer)
