= Russborough House =

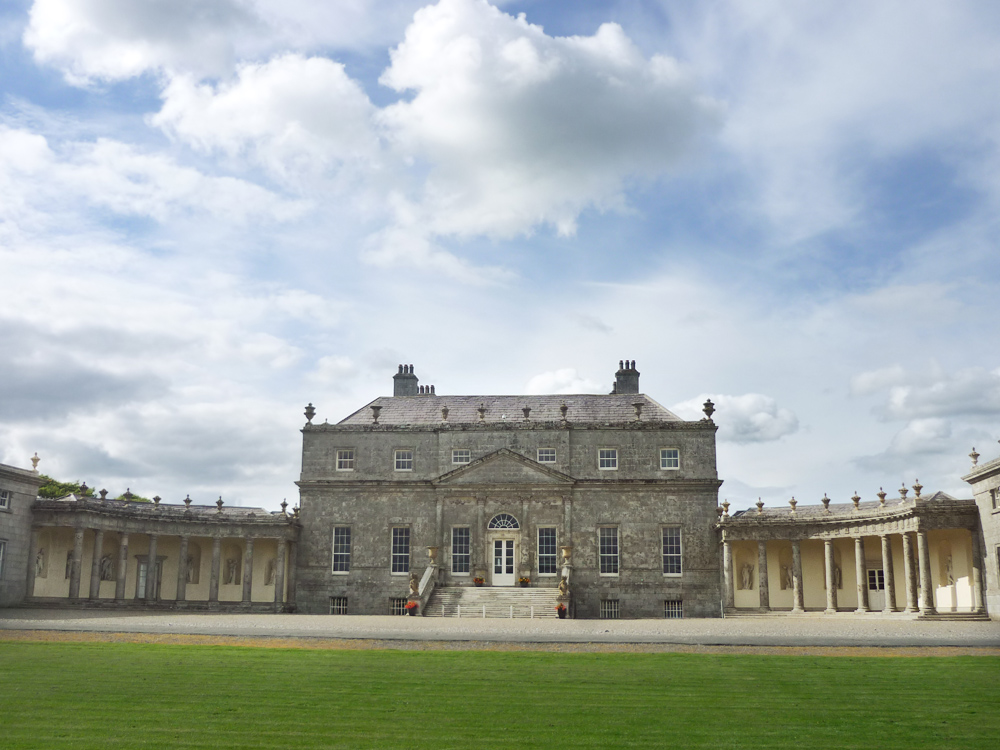
- The front facade at Russborough

- Location within Ireland

General information
- Status: Private dwelling house
- Type: House
- Architectural style: Palladian
- Location: Russelstown; County Wicklow; W91 W284, Ireland
- Coordinates: 53.14166°N 6.5696°W
- Construction started: 1741
- Estimated completion: 1748
- Owner: The Alfred Beit foundation

Technical details
- Material: granite
- Floor count: 3

Design and construction
- Architects: Richard Castle, Francis Bindon
- Developer: Joseph Leeson, 1st Earl of Milltown
- Other designers: Lafranchini brothers (stuccowork)

Website
- http://www.russborough.ie/

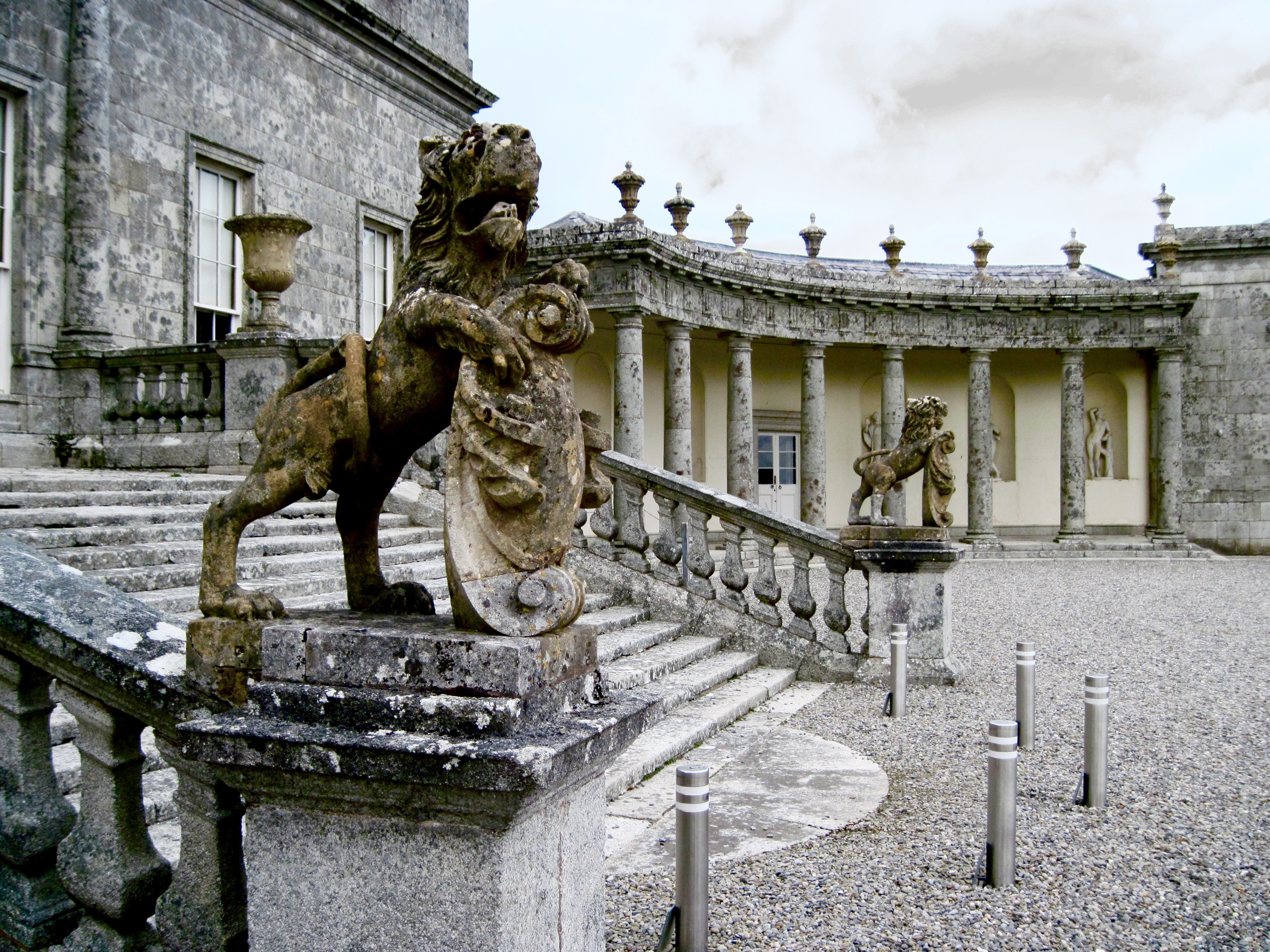
West courtyard and statuary.

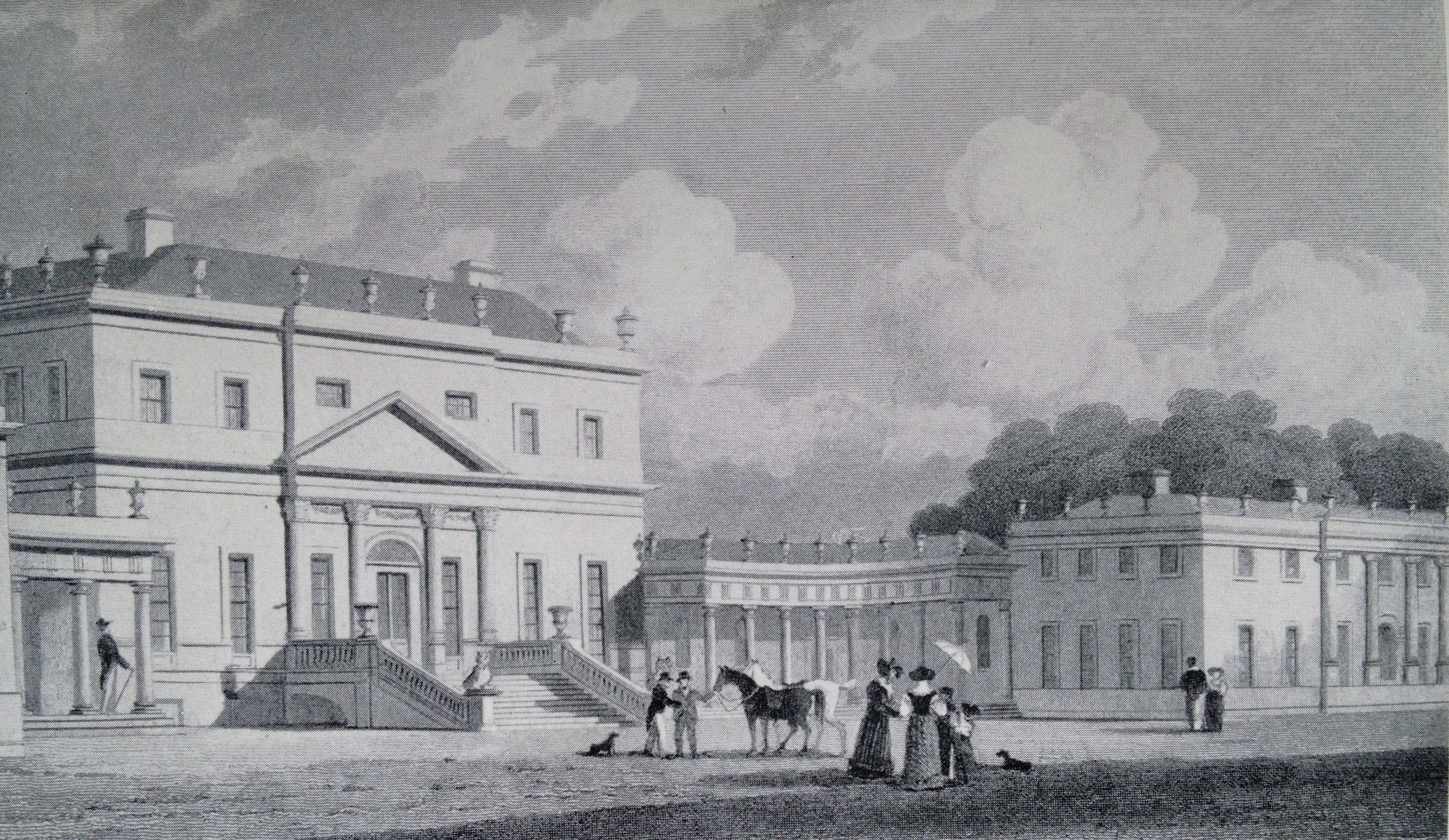
Russborough House in an illustration by John Preston Neale of 1826.

Russborough House is a Georgian Palladian house between Blessington and Ballymore Eustace near the Blessington Lakes in County Wicklow, Ireland. The house was designed by Richard Castle for Joseph Leeson, 1st Earl of Milltown and built between 1741 and 1755. It has an exceptionally long frontage measuring 210 m (690 ft). The interior contains fine ornate plasterwork on the ceilings by the Lafranchini brothers, who also collaborated with Castle on Carton House. Russborough contains an important private collection of European fine and decorative arts, including furniture, silver, porcelain and paintings many of which have now been transferred to galleries for safe keeping.

Russborough is open to visitors and is located on a 200-acre (81 ha) estate, with many of the original 18th-century features still in place including the walled garden, ice-house, lime kiln and the serpentine lakes. There is also a restaurant, shop and 2 km (1.2 mi) maze.

== History ==
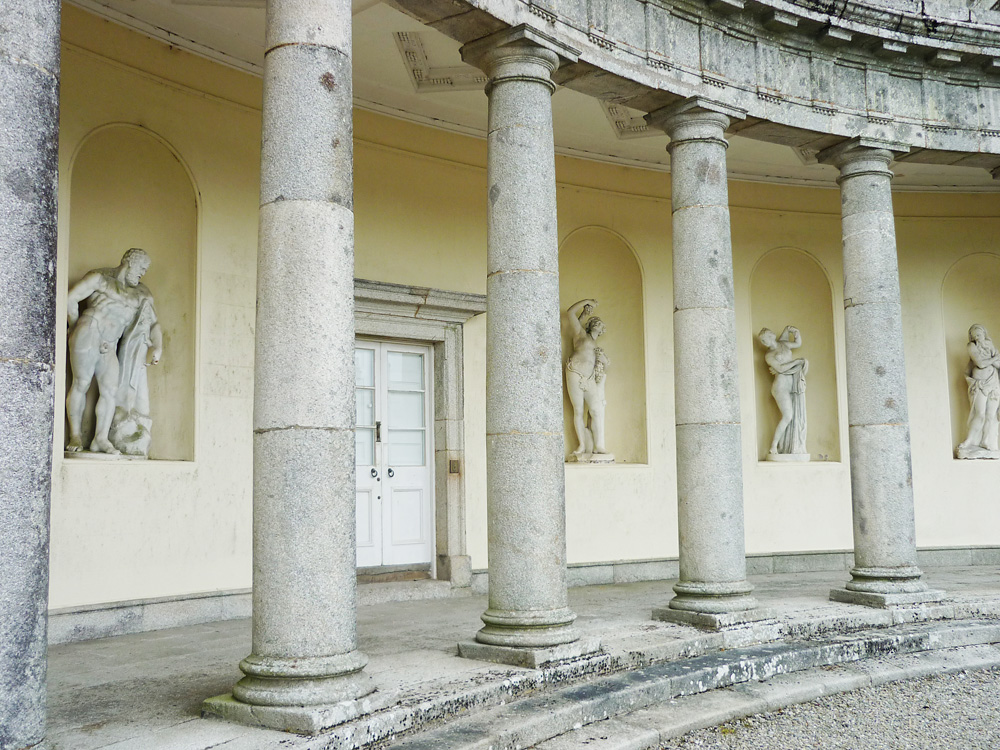
Paladian-style

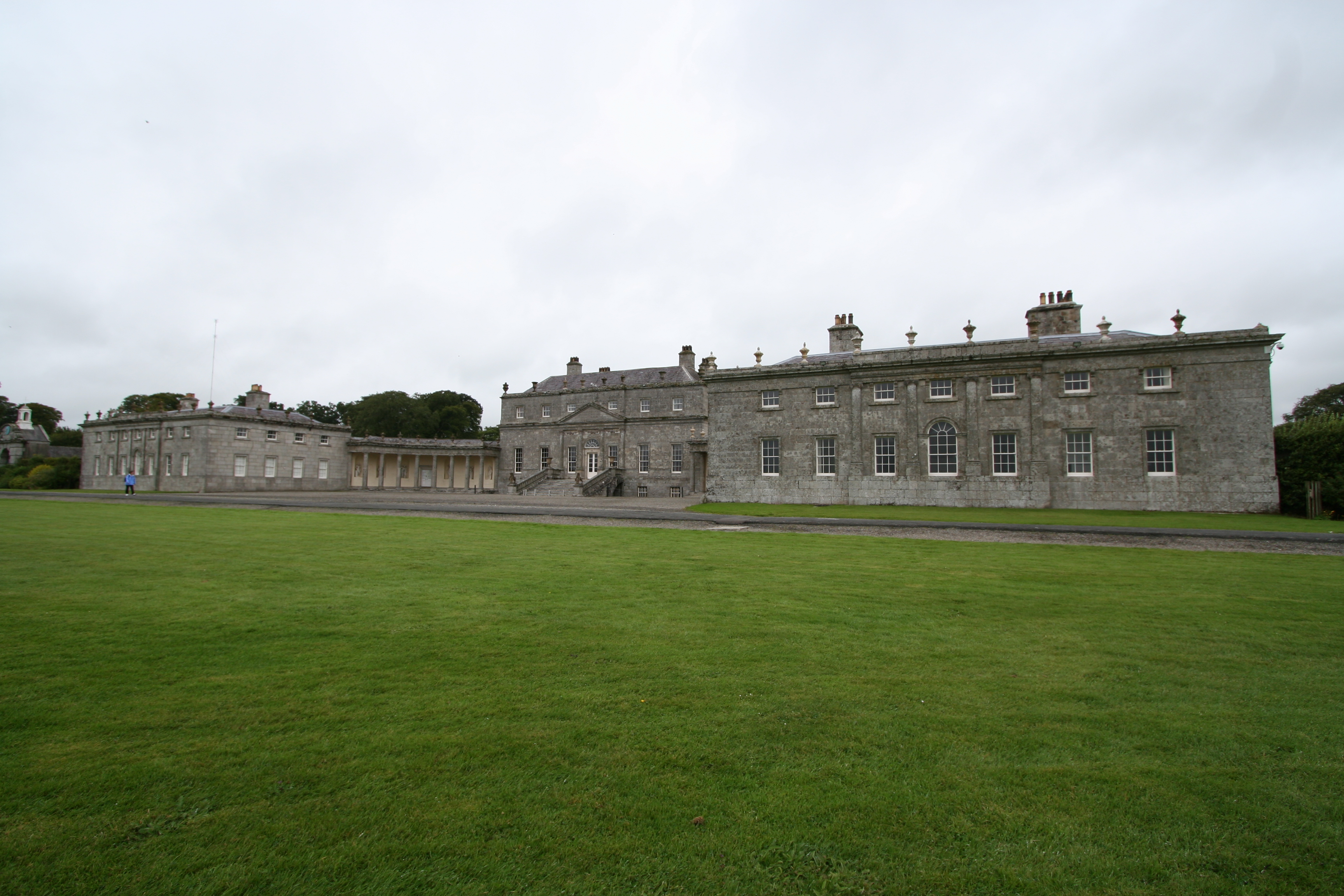
Russborough House in 2007

=== Leeson family ownership ===
The Leeson family originated from near Culworth in the English county of Northamptonshire and had moved to Ireland by around 1680 with the first recorded member being Hugh Leeson. A sizeable fortune made in brewing and property development in Dublin passed down to Hugh's grandson Joseph Leeson, who bought land at what was then Russelltown. He became an MP and was made Earl of Milltown in 1763.

Russborough House was designed for Joseph Leeson by Richard Castle and built between 1741 and 1755. While the house was being built Joseph embarked on two Grand Tours to acquire a suitably impressive collection of paintings, sculpture and furnishings to adorn his new home. Back at Russborough, Ireland's and Europe's finest artisans and craftspeople were appointed by Castle to create a lavish interior. It remained in the possession of the Earls of Milltown until the sixth earl. On the death of his widow in 1914 it passed to a nephew, Edmund Turton, who rarely stayed there. On Turton's death in 1929, his widow sold the house to Captain Denis Bowes Daly in 1931.

Between 1937 and 1940, the Liffey valley in front of the house was flooded in order to create Poulaphouca Reservoir, also known as the Blessington Lakes.

=== Beit family ownership ===
Sir Alfred Beit bought Russborough in 1952 from Captain Daly to house his art collection and in 1976 established the Alfred Beit Foundation, a registered charity, to manage the property. Described as Ireland's most beautiful Georgian house, the foundation opened the historic mansion and its collections to the Irish public in 1978. Beit died in 1994 and Lady Beit remained in residence until her own death in 2005.

On 7 February 2010, a fire severely damaged the west wing and caused part of the roof to collapse. No art was damaged, having been removed along with furniture to allow for restorations to the west wing. Initial examinations of the damage suggested an electrical fault from wiring in the roof may have sparked the fire.

== Architecture and gardens ==
Russborough is a classical Palladian villa made up of a central block containing the principal rooms and two wings housing the servants and stable blocks to the east and west. Castle enhanced his core design with a wealth of features. The Greek orders are observed in the Doric columns of the colonnades and the Corinthian columns that flank the main entrance, supporting a fused portico enriched with swags of flowers. At the bottom of the flight of granite steps the visitor is greeted by a pair of heraldic lions, bearers of the Leeson arms. Russborough's central block contains seven principal rooms on the ground floor with the largest, the Entrance Hall at centre of the south front, and the main reception room, the Saloon placed directly to its north. The other five rooms, originally comprising two Drawing Rooms, two Dining Rooms, and a Music Room complete a symmetrical arrangement. The ceilings of several rooms and the main stairhall feature elaborate stucco work attributed to the Swiss-Italian stuccodores, Paolo and Filippo Lafrancini.

The Russborough demesne extends to 200 acres, with a number of walks, gardens and original 18th century features. From the start, the estate was laid out to a formal design. This is still reflected in the remnants of the extensive lawn and terraces with a shaped pond in the middle to the north of the house. Meanwhile, to the south there is a more naturalistic prospect with rolling fields, serpentine lakes and mature woodland. It remains an almost intact example of an Irish demesne from this period, with features such as the Walled Garden, the ice-house and the lime kiln.

There is a 2 km maze, craft courtyard of artisan studios and The National Bird of Prey Centre.

== Art collections ==
Russborough has housed two fine art collections, begun with the Milltown estate, whose collection was donated to the National Gallery of Ireland by the widow of the sixth earl, Lady Geraldine Milltown in 1902.

Sir Alfred and Clementine, Lady Beit, a cousin of the Mitford sisters, bought the house in 1952 where he housed his own family's collection, started by his uncle, Alfred Beit, comprising works by many great artists. Sir Alfred and Lady Beit established the Alfred Beit Foundation as a registered charity in 1976 to safeguard the house and collections for future generations. In 1987, they donated seventeen of their finest paintings to the National Gallery of Ireland. Russborough opened to the public as a museum and visitor attraction in 1978. Among the Collection's treasures still in Russborough are an outstanding array of eighteenth-century French and English furniture, many important paintings from the 17th to 20th centuries. Four Vernet paintings entitled 'Morning', 'Midday', 'Sunset', and 'Night' were actually painted for Russborough in the 1750s and had remained in the house for most of the last 260 years. In addition it exhibits one of the finest private collections of 18th-century silver and porcelain in Ireland, including significant pieces by Meissen and Sèvres.

=== Art robberies ===
Portions of the Russborough collection have been stolen on multiple occasions.

These include thefts in:

- In 1974 by an IRA gang including British heiress Rose Dugdale which resulted in nineteen paintings being stolen with all nineteen eventually recovered.
- In 1986 Martin Cahill stole eighteen paintings with sixteen eventually recovered; in 2001 two paintings were stolen with both recovered the next year.
- In 2002 by Martin Cahill's associate Martin Foley five paintings were stolen with all five later recovered.

Two paintings, Gainsborough's Madame Bacelli and Vermeer's Lady writing a Letter with her Maid, the latter probably the most valuable painting of the collection, were stolen twice across the thefts, although each was subsequently recovered (the latter in 1993, the same year as the recovery of Goya's Portrait of Dona Antonia Zarate).

As of February 2025, only two of the stolen paintings by Francesco Guardi of Venetian landscapes have not been recovered.

=== List of notable works from the collection ===
Creator	Item	Title	Location	Notes
Peter Paul Rubens	Painting	Head of a Monk		
Jean-Baptiste Oudry	Painting	Indian Blackbuck with Three Pointers		
Thomas Gainsbrough	Painting	Madame Bacelli		Stolen and recovered on two occasions.
Adriaen van Ostade	Painting	The Adoration of the Shepherds		
Pierre Puvis de Chavannes	Painting	La Colonie Grecque, Marseilles		
John Vanderbank	Tapestry	Tapestry		
William Kent	Table	Console Table		
Johannes Vermeer	Painting	Lady Writing a Letter with her Maid	National Gallery of Ireland	Stolen and recovered on two occasions.
Francisco Goya	Painting	Portrait of Doña Antonia Zárate	National Gallery of Ireland	
Frans Hals	Painting	The Lute Player		
Gabriël Metsu	Painting	Man Writing a Letter		
Antoine Vestier	Painting	Portrait of the Princesse de Lamballe		
Claude-Joseph Vernet	Painting	Morning, Midday, Sunset and Night		Created specifically for the house in the 1760s.
Francesco Guardi	Painting		Unknown	Two paintings depicting Venice which were stolen in 1986 and still have not been recovered as of February 2025.

== In popular culture ==
Russborough House was used as a setting in 2011 film Haywire, and the 2016 film Love & Friendship.

The house was featured in Travel Channel's Mysteries at the Castle.

The external view of the house was used in the 2012 mini series Titanic: Blood and Steel.

The 2023 film Baltimore was about the theft and recovery of nineteen old master paintings from the collection, valued at IR£8 million, by British heiress Rose Dugdale and other IRA members.
