= Lafranchini brothers =

Swiss stucco artists

The Lafranchini brothers, originally from Switzerland, are famed today for their work in Rococo style Stucco, chiefly in the great Palladian houses of Ireland.

Paul Lafranchini (1695–1776) worked for James Gibbs in England. In 1736 he went to Ireland where he worked for the architect Richard Cassels. In 1739 he was joined in Ireland by his brother Philip (1702–1779). Together they worked on their masterpiece, the golden salon at Carton House, County Kildare, designed by Cassels. Here they created an ornamental plaster-work ceiling depicting the Courtship of the Gods.

They worked on many major projects with Cassels, including Russborough and Tyrone House, Dublin. The decorative features they created, which included rosettes, swags, flora and fauna, decorated the ceilings and walls of many of Ireland's greatest 18th-century houses, giving these mansions the individualism which distinguishes them from other Palladian revival houses in Europe.

As of the late 1990s, "excellent plasterwork" of the Lafranchini brothers could still be seen at number 85 Stephen's Green, Dublin, one of the oldest surviving houses on the south side of the Green.

== List of notable stucco work locations ==
- Carton House, County Kildare
- Castletown House, Celbridge
- Curraghmore, County Waterford,
- Kilshannig House, County Cork
- Newman House, Dublin
- Northumberland House, London (destroyed)
- Riverstown House, Riverstown, Glanmire, County Cork
- Russborough
- 9 St Stephen's Green, Dublin
- Summerhill House, County Meath (destroyed)
- Tyrone House, Dublin
