= Kidnapping of Tiede Herrema =

Dutch businessman

Tiede Herrema
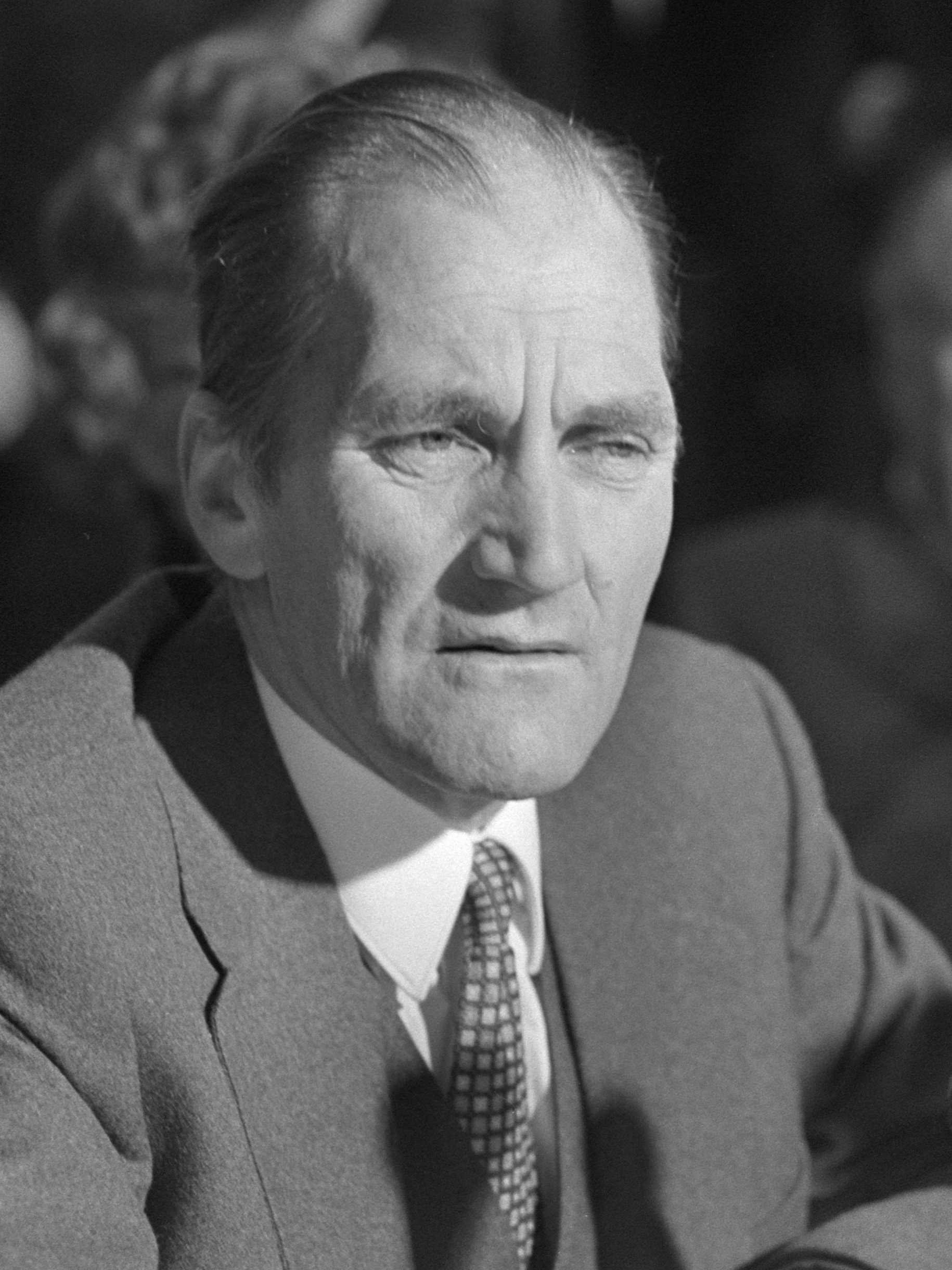
- Born: April 21, 1921; Zuilen, Netherlands
- Died: April 24, 2020 (aged 99); Arnhem, Netherlands
- Occupation: Businessman
- Known for: Being kidnapped by the Provisional IRA
- Spouse: Elizabeth Herrema

In October 1975, Dutch businessman Tiede Herrema (21 April 1921 – 24 April 2020) was kidnapped by the Provisional IRA in Castletroy, near Limerick. This triggered a large Garda investigation and a two-week siege, after which Herrema was released unharmed.

== Biography ==
Tiede Herrema was born in Zuilen (then a municipality, today part of Utrecht) in 1921. During World War II, he was arrested by Nazis because he was in the Dutch resistance, and was sent to the Ratibor forced labour camp in Poland. After being liberated by Soviet forces, he walked 500 km to American lines. In the 1970s, Herrema ran a wire factory, Ferenka, in the city of Limerick, Ireland. At the time, this was the city's biggest employer, with approximately 1,400 workers.

== Kidnapping and rescue ==
On the morning of 3 October 1975, having just left his home in Castletroy near Limerick, Herrema was abducted by Provisional Irish Republican Army members Eddie Gallagher and Marion Coyle. The kidnappers demanded the release of three IRA prisoners, including Rose Dugdale.

After a massive security operation, the kidnappers were eventually traced on 21 October 1975 to a house in Monasterevin, County Kildare. After a further two-week-long siege, Herrema was released, shaken, but unharmed. He left Ireland soon after.

== Aftermath ==
He eventually returned to Ireland to present an episode of Saturday Live in 1987. He and his wife Elizabeth were made honorary Irish citizens in 1975, and he was made a Freeman of the city of Limerick. In 2005, he donated his personal papers to the University of Limerick. Herrema died in April 2020, 5 days after his wife's death and 3 days after his 99th birthday.

== See also ==
- List of kidnappings (1970–1979)
- List of solved missing person cases (1970s)
