= All of You (2024 film) =

2024 American film by William Bridges

- Release poster
- Directed by: William Bridges
- Written by: Brett Goldstein; William Bridges
- Produced by: Aaron Ryder; Andrew Swett; William Bridges; Brett Goldstein
- Starring: Brett Goldstein; Imogen Poots; Zawe Ashton; Steven Cree; Jenna Coleman
- Cinematography: Benoît Soler
- Edited by: Victoria Boydell
- Music by: Ian Hultquist; Sofia degli Alessandri
- Production companies: Republic Pictures; MRC; Ryder Picture Company
- Distributed by: Apple TV+
- Release dates: September 7, 2024 (TIFF); September 26, 2025 (United States)
- Running time: 98 minutes
- Country: United States
- Language: English

All of You is a 2024 American science fiction romantic drama film directed by William Bridges. It stars Brett Goldstein, Imogen Poots, Zawe Ashton, Steven Cree, and Jenna Coleman. Goldstein also served as a co-writer and co-producer. It premiered at the Toronto International Film Festival on September 7, 2024, and was released on September 26, 2025, by Apple TV+.

== Plot ==
The film takes place in the same fictional universe as the television series Soulmates (2020). Simon and Laura are best friends. Laura is eager to take a test (offered by a company called Soul Connex) that claims it can scientifically identify your one true soulmate. Simon, while skeptical of the test, pays for Laura to take it. When Laura takes the test, she is matched with a man named Lukas. Laura eventually marries Lukas and has a child, but she and Simon remain close.

Simon, meanwhile, struggles with his unspoken love for Laura, and in different periods of time, he dates other people, but never fully moves on. As Laura questions aspects of her marriage and relationship with Simon, temptation and emotional tension build. Eventually, Laura and Simon begin an affair, though Laura is not willing to leave her family for Simon. The emotional toll comes to a head when Simon asks Laura to leave her husband and child to be with him, but Laura refuses. Simon realizes that he can’t live on intermittent stolen moments alone, and he walks away.

Later, Simon and Laura briefly reunite and have a final weekend together, but their goodbye is bittersweet. Laura suggests moving with Simon to California, but it feels hollow. Simon acknowledges he will always miss her, and Laura leaves in a cab without looking back.

== Cast ==
- Brett Goldstein as Simon
- Imogen Poots as Laura
- Zawe Ashton as Andrea
- Steven Cree as Lukas
- Jenna Coleman as Dee
- Éva Magyar as Jay Gorin

== Production ==
Writers William Bridges and Brett Goldstein had worked on the film for 10 years, with Goldstein referring to it as "[his] baby". During casting, Goldstein met Imogen Poots over Zoom and was immediately convinced that she should play the role of Laura.

== Release ==
A promotional still from the film was released on July 22, 2024. The film premiered at the Toronto International Film Festival on September 7, 2024. On December 11, 2024, it was announced that Apple TV+ had acquired the film for distribution. It was released on the service on September 26, 2025.

== Reception ==
On the review aggregator website Rotten Tomatoes, 73% of 63 critics' reviews are positive, with an average rating of 6.3/10. The website's consensus reads: "Elevated by the sparky chemistry between Brett Goldstein and Imogen Poots, All of You's sci-fi hook and tearjerker trajectory aren't always a perfect match but does yield a romance to remember." Metacritic, which uses a weighted average, assigned the film a score of 66 out of 100, based on 14 critics, indicating "generally favorable" reviews.

Maureen Lee Lenker of Entertainment Weekly gave the film a grade of A− and wrote, "Apart from the sci-fi element of the soulmate test, it's familiar fodder for romantic drama, but it's of the highest caliber thanks to its sharp script and devastating central performances.... Watching All of You is like pressing on a bruise, and ooh, baby, it hurts so good." David Ehrlich of IndieWire gave the film a grade of B− and called it a "small but sharp high-concept romance".

Steve Pond of TheWrap wrote, "Director William Bridges, making his feature debut after co-writing the film with [Brett] Goldstein and basing it on a short the two of them made 15 years ago, is pretty sure-handed with the comic elements that win us over before he fully commits to weepy moments and swelling strings. It makes the film another crowd-pleaser at a festival that has been long not on prestige awards-bait movies, but on interesting and satisfying audience films."

Whang Yee Ling of The Straits Times gave the film 2/5 stars, writing, "Whatever its high concept, this is simply another tale of star-crossed lovers trapped in the messy unpredictability of life." Reuben Baron of AwardsWatch wrote, "If All of You is Bridges' attempt at making his own "Hang the DJ," it's an inferior one. It may connect with others more, but even with good acting and some decent humor, it didn't connect with me at all. And this is the last I expect to think about it ever again."

== See also ==
- Soulmates – 2020 American miniseries
