= Imogen Poots =

British actress (born 1989)

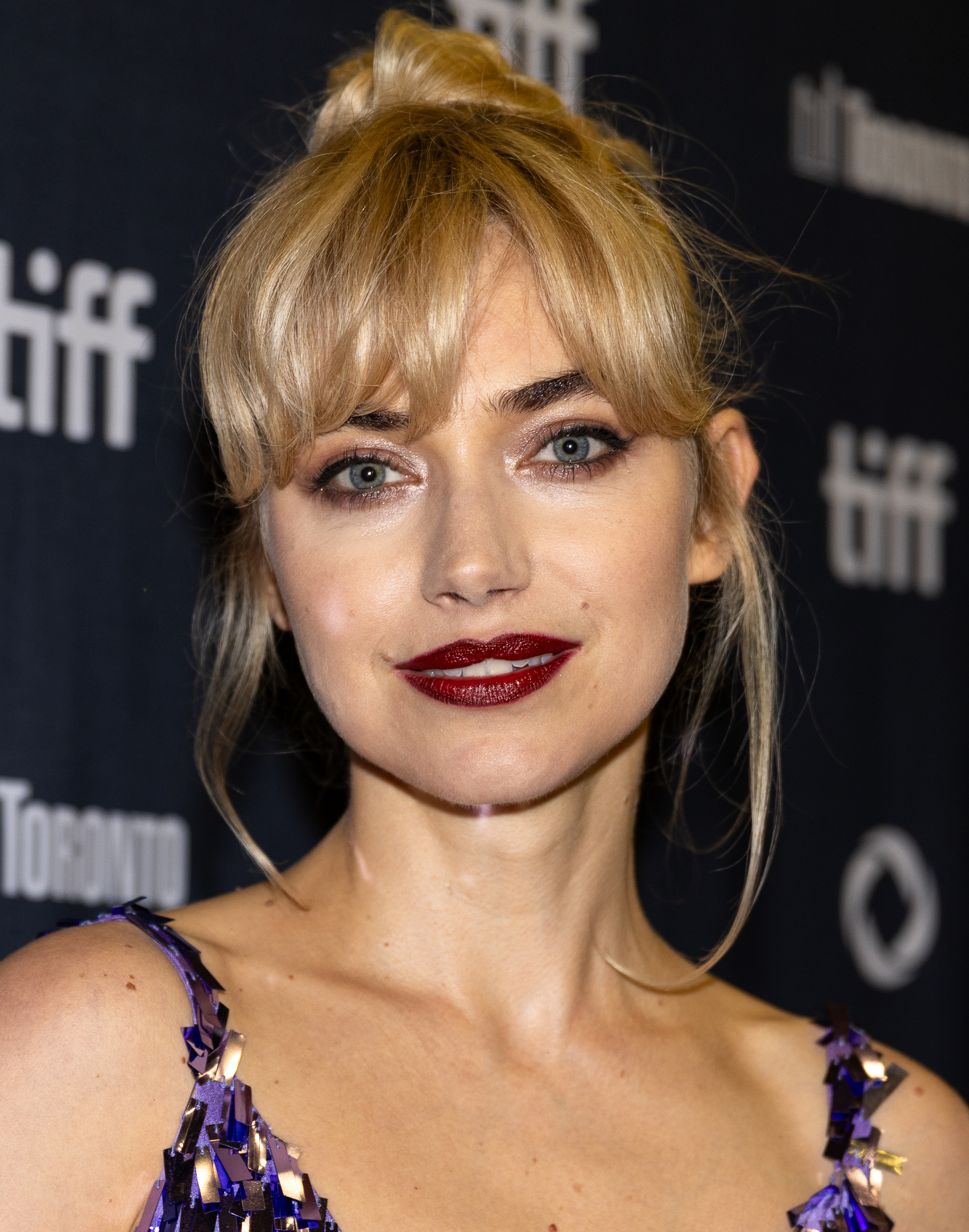
- Poots in 2025
- Born: Imogen Gay Poots; June 3, 1989 (age 37); Hammersmith, London, England
- Occupation: Actress
- Years active: 2004–present
- Partner: James Norton (2017–2023)

Imogen Gay Poots (born June 3, 1989) is an English actress. She played Tammy in the post-apocalyptic horror film 28 Weeks Later (2007), Linda Keith in the Jimi Hendrix biopic Jimi: All Is by My Side (2013), Debbie Raymond in the Paul Raymond biopic The Look of Love (2013), and Julia Maddon in the American action film Need for Speed (2014). Also in 2014, she portrayed Jess Crichton in A Long Way Down, alongside Pierce Brosnan and Aaron Paul. She appeared as Isabella "Izzy" Patterson in Peter Bogdanovich's She's Funny That Way. In 2016, she starred as Kelly Ann in the Showtime series Roadies. In 2019, she co-starred with Jesse Eisenberg in the films Vivarium and The Art of Self-Defense. In 2020, she played Laura in The Father (2020).

== Early life and education ==
Imogen Gay Poots was born in June 1989 at the Queen Charlotte's and Chelsea Hospital in Hammersmith, London, the daughter of Trevor Poots, a current affairs television producer from Belfast, and Fiona Goodall, a journalist and voluntary worker from Brighton. She has an older brother.

Raised in Chiswick, West London, Poots was privately educated, attending Bute House Preparatory School for Girls in Brook Green, Queen's Gate School in South Kensington, and Latymer Upper School in Hammersmith. While intending to become a veterinary surgeon, she began spending Saturdays at an improvisation workshop hosted by the Young Blood Theatre Company at the Riverside Studios in Hammersmith. She abandoned her original career aspiration after fainting at the sight of veterinary surgery during work experience.

Attaining three A grades at A-level, she won a place at the Courtauld Institute of Art in 2008, but had it deferred for two years in order to pursue her acting career.

== Career ==
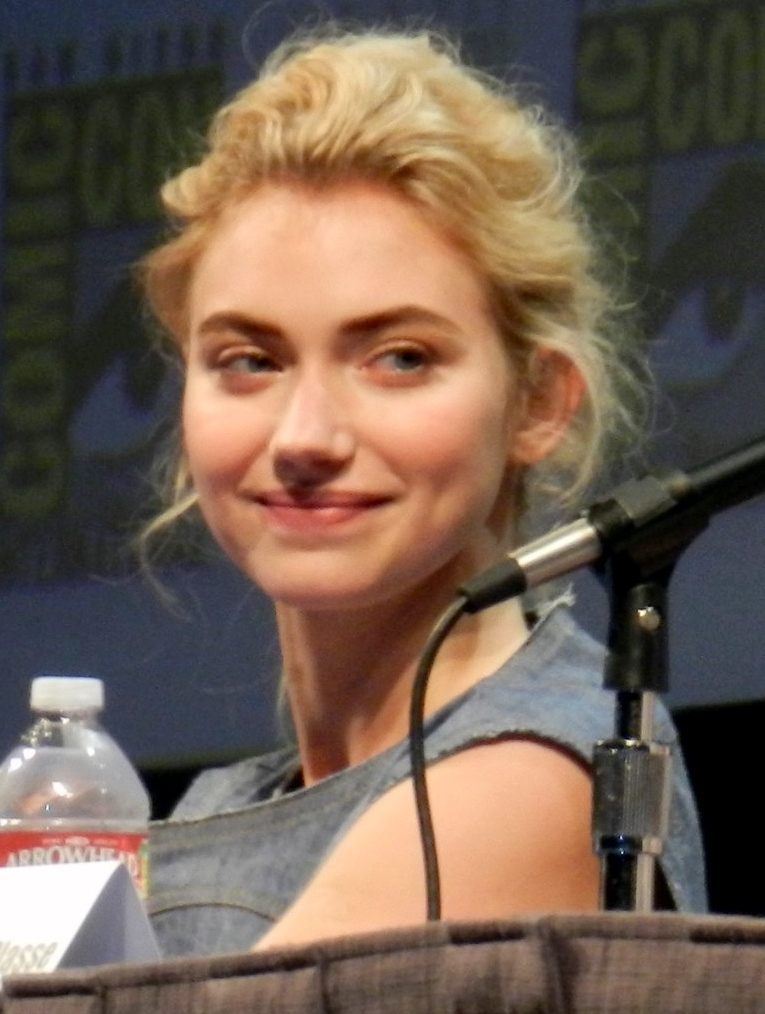
Poots at the Fright Night panel at San Diego Comic-Con 2011

Poots first appeared on-screen in a 2004 episode of Casualty and had a non-speaking role in 2006's V for Vendetta, but she was largely unknown when, at the age of 17, Juan Carlos Fresnadillo cast her in the horror film 28 Weeks Later, released in 2007. She then appeared in films such as Cracks (2009), Centurion (2010), and as the female lead in the 2011 remake of Fright Night alongside Anton Yelchin. Although Poots has never formally trained as an actress, according to Giles Hattersley, she developed her acting skills through a practical apprenticeship that may have served her well, as she is "compellingly natural" in front of the camera.

In 2011, she was chosen by fashion house Chloé to appear in a campaign for its eponymous fragrance shot by Inez van Lamsweerde and Vinoodh Matadin. In 2012, she was selected to star in a Sofia Coppola-directed advertising campaign for a collaboration between fashion label Marni and high street retailer H&M.

In 2012, Poots played the acrimonious young violinist Alexandra Gelbart opposite Catherine Keener and Philip Seymour Hoffman in A Late Quartet. In 2013, she appeared in Greetings from Tim Buckley, Filth, and The Look of Love, and portrayed Linda Keith in the Jimi Hendrix biopic Jimi: All Is by My Side, alongside André Benjamin as Hendrix. In 2014, Poots starred in the romantic comedy That Awkward Moment and the action film Need for Speed, an adaptation of the video game series, and played Jess in the black comedy A Long Way Down. In 2015, she appeared opposite Owen Wilson in She's Funny That Way with Jennifer Aniston and Knight of Cups with Cate Blanchett, has been cast in the adaptation of Jess Walter's novel Beautiful Ruins, and reunited with Yelchin for Green Room. In 2016, she starred as Kelly Ann in the Showtime series Roadies.

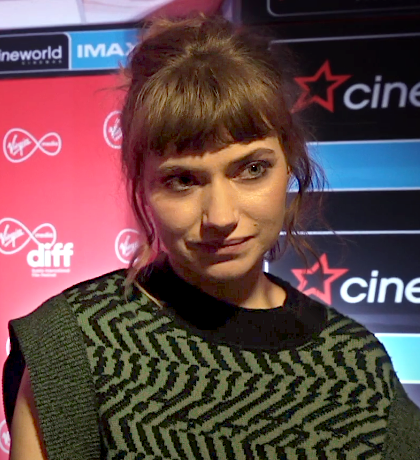
Poots at the 2020 Dublin International Film Festival

In 2017, she played Honey in Who's Afraid of Virginia Woolf?, which was broadcast via National Theatre Live on 18 May 2017 from the Harold Pinter Theatre in the London West End. Her performance earned her a nomination for the Laurence Olivier Award for Best Actress in a Supporting Role. Also that year, Poots starred in the Amy Herzog play Belleville at the Donmar Warehouse opposite James Norton.

In 2022, she began playing the role of the mysterious Autumn in the Prime Video science fiction neo-Western series Outer Range. The show was canceled in 2024.

She played Rose Dugdale, a wealthy and cultured member of the British upper class–turned–Provisional IRA member, in the 2023 film Baltimore. That same year, she played Lisa, a British volunteer in Palestine, in the drama film The Teacher.

In 2024, she starred in the romantic sci-fi film All of You opposite Brett Goldstein.

In 2025, she starred as swimmer Lidia Yuknavitch in Kristen Stewart's directorial debut, the psychological drama The Chronology of Water, earning widespread praise for her role. The same year, she played Thea in Nia DaCosta's film Hedda.

She will next star in an untitled film directed by Jeremy Saulnier and costarring Cory Michael Smith and Chase Sui Wonders.

== Personal life ==
From 2017 to 2023, Poots was in a relationship with fellow actor James Norton. She divides her time between London and New York City.

== Filmography ==
=== Film ===
Year	Title	Role	Notes
2005	V for Vendetta	Young Valerie Page	
2007	28 Weeks Later	Tammy Harris	
2007	Wish	Jane	Short film
2008	Me and Orson Welles	Lorelei Lathrop	
2009	Cracks	Poppy	
2009	Waking Madison	Alexis	
2009	Solitary Man	Allyson Karsch	
2010	Centurion	Arianne	
2010	Chatroom	Eva	
2011	Jane Eyre	Blanche Ingram	
2011	Fright Night	Amy Peterson	
2011	Comes a Bright Day	Mary Bright	
2012	A Late Quartet	Alexandra Gelbart	
2013	Greetings from Tim Buckley	Allie	
2013	Jimi: All Is by My Side	Linda Keith	
2013	Filth	Amanda Drummond	
2013	The Look of Love	Debbie Raymond	
2014	That Awkward Moment	Ellie Andrews	
2014	A Long Way Down	Jess Crichton	
2014	Need for Speed	Julia Maddon	
2014	She's Funny That Way	Isabella Patterson	
2015	Knight of Cups	Della	
2015	Green Room	Amber	
2015	A Country Called Home	Ellie	
2016	Frank & Lola	Lola	
2016	Popstar: Never Stop Never Stopping	Ashley Wednesday	
2016	Killing for Love	Elizabeth Haysom	Voice; documentary
2017	Have Had	Grace	Short film
2017	Sweet Virginia	Lila	
2017	Mobile Homes	Ali	
2017	I Kill Giants	Karen	
2018	Age Out	Joan	
2019	The Art of Self-Defense	Anna	
2019	Vivarium	Gemma	Also executive producer
2019	Castle in the Ground	Ana	
2019	Black Christmas	Riley Stone	
2020	The Father	Laura	
2020	French Exit	Susan	
2023	Baltimore	Rose Dugdale	
2023	The Teacher	Lisa	
2024	All of You	Laura	
2025	The Chronology of Water	Lidia Yuknavitch	
2025	Hedda	Thea Clifton	
2027	Slayground †	TBA	Post-production

Key
†	Denotes films that have not yet been released

=== Television ===
Year	Title	Role	Notes
2004	Casualty	Alice Thornton	Episode: "Love Bites"
2008	Miss Austen Regrets	Fanny Austen-Knight	TV movie
2010	Bouquet of Barbed Wire	Prue Sorenson	Main cast, miniseries
2010	Christopher and His Kind	Jean Ross	TV movie
2016	Roadies	Kelly Ann Mason	Main cast
2020	I Know This Much Is True	Joy Hanks	Main cast, miniseries
2022–2024	Outer Range	Autumn	Main cast

=== Stage ===
Year	Play	Role	Theatre	Ref.
2017	Who's Afraid of Virginia Woolf?	Honey	Harold Pinter Theatre	
2017	Belleville	Abby	Donmar Warehouse	

== Awards and nominations ==
Year	Accolade	Category	Nominated work	Result	Ref.
2007	British Independent Film Award	BIFA Most Promising Newcomer	28 Weeks Later	Nominated	
2011	Alliance of Women Film Journalists Award	Most Egregious Age Difference Between the Leading Man and the Love Interest (shared with Michael Douglas)	Solitary Man	Won	
2012	Hamptons International Film Festival	Breakthrough Performer	Knight of Cups	Won	
2012	Hamptons International Film Festival	10 Actors to Watch	A Late Quartet	Won	
2012	Napa Valley Film Festival	Rising Star	—N/a	Honored	
2013	British Independent Film Award	BIFA Best Supporting Actress	The Look of Love	Won	
2016	Fright Meter Award	Best Supporting Actress	Green Room	Nominated	
2017	The Stage Awards	The Joe Allen Best West End Debut	Who's Afraid of Virginia Woolf?	Nominated	
2017	WhatsOnStage Awards	Best Supporting Actress in a play	Who's Afraid of Virginia Woolf?	Nominated	
2018	Laurence Olivier Award	Best Actress in a Supporting Role	Who's Afraid of Virginia Woolf?	Nominated	
2019	Sitges Film Festival	Best Actress	Vivarium	Won	
2025	Denver Film Festival	Excellence in Acting Award	The Chronology of Water	Honored	
2026	Girls on Film Awards	Best Performance in a Leading Role	The Chronology of Water	Nominated	
2026	Girls on Film Awards	Best Ensemble Cast	Hedda	Nominated	
