= Annacotty railway station =

Closed station in County Limerick, Ireland

Annacotty

General information
- Location: Annacotty, County Limerick; Ireland
- Coordinates: 52.6637°N 8.5108°W

History
- Original company: Waterford and Limerick Railway
- Pre-grouping: Great Southern and Western Railway
- Post-grouping: Great Southern Railways

Key dates
- 8 August 1858: Station opens as Grange
- 1928: Station renamed Annacotty
- 9 September 1963: Station closes

Services
Preceding station	Disused railways	Following station
Killonan	Great Southern and Western Railway; Limerick-Waterford	Lisnagry
Location

Annacotty railway station, on the Ballybrophy branch, served the village of Annacotty in County Limerick, Ireland.

The station opened on 8 August 1858 and closed on 9 September 1963.

== History ==
Opened as Grange station by the Waterford and Limerick Railway, by the beginning of the 20th century the station was run by the Great Southern and Western Railway. It was absorbed into the Great Southern Railways in 1925.

The station was then nationalised, passing on to the Córas Iompair Éireann as a result of the Transport Act 1944 which took effect from 1 January 1945. It was closed in 1963.
