= Marion Coyle =

Irish Republican (born 1954)

Marion Coyle (born 1954) is a former member of the Provisional Irish Republican Army (IRA).

== Background ==
Marion Coyle was born in July 1954 in Derry, Northern Ireland, and lived in the Duncreggan Road, a rather middle-class and fashionable area of Derry. Coyle was a student in typing and advanced English at the time of the civil rights demonstrations and civil disorder which culminated in the Battle of the Bogside. In his work, Hostage:Notorious Irish Kidnappings, Paul Howard notes that Coyle was a very quiet teenager "showing none of the qualities that would make her one of the IRA's most fearless and respected Volunteers. On the night of 26 June 1970 her uncle Joe Coyle, who was a member of the IRA's Derry leadership, along with Thomas Carlin, Tommy McCool and his two young daughters died when a bomb they were preparing in the kitchen of Tommy McCool's house on the Creggan estate exploded prematurely. Following this, her brother Phillip was arrested and imprisoned for possession of a firearm.

In 1973 Coyle and three others were arrested in Sligo after they were stopped in a car containing guns and ammunition. The alleged IRA Northern OC, Leo Martin was charged in relation to the incident. In 1974 Coyle was acquitted of the attempted murder of a Garda officer during the re-arrest of Kevin Mallon in Portlaoise (Mallon had been one of three IRA prisoners who escaped from Mountjoy Prison in 1973 using a helicopter).

== Monasterevin Siege ==
On 3 October 1975 Coyle and another IRA member, Eddie Gallagher, kidnapped industrialist Tiede Herrema near his home in Castletroy, a suburb of Limerick. They were traced to a house in Monasterevin, County Kildare, and a two-week siege began. Coyle and Gallagher demanded the release of three republican prisoners, including Rose Dugdale, in return for the release of Herrema, but the authorities refused to grant any concessions. The siege ended on 7 November when Herrema was released, and Coyle and Gallagher were arrested. The kidnapping was the longest in Irish history.

In March 1976 Coyle was sentenced to 15 years in prison for the abduction, while Gallagher received a 20-year sentence. Herrema has stated he believes the sentences were too long, describing Coyle and Gallagher as young people who did something stupid. Coyle was released from prison in 1985, and Gallagher in 1990.
