= Lady Writing a Letter with her Maid =

1670–1671 painting by Johannes Vermeer

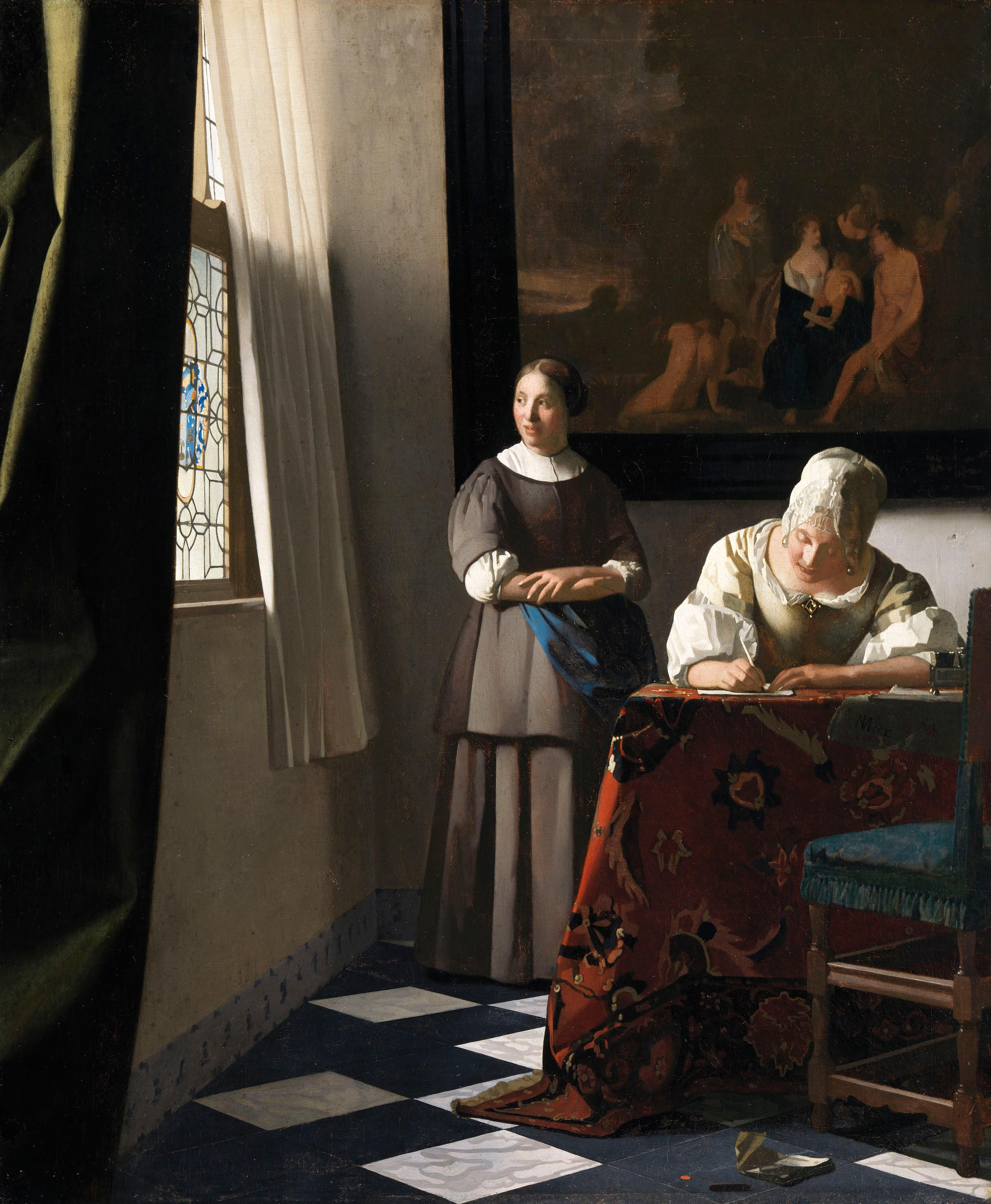
- Artist: Johannes Vermeer
- Year: c. 1670–1671
- Medium: Oil on canvas
- Dimensions: 71.1 cm × 60.5 cm (28.0 in × 23.8 in)
- Location: National Gallery of Ireland, Dublin

Lady Writing a Letter with her Maid (Dutch: Schrijvende vrouw met dienstbode) is a painting by the Dutch artist Johannes Vermeer, completed in 1670–1671 and on display at the National Gallery of Ireland, in Dublin, Ireland. The painting shows a standing woman seemingly acting as a messenger between the seated younger lady and her unseen lover.

It was famously stolen on 27 April 1974 during a raid on Russborough House, Ireland, and again in 1986 by a gang led by the Dublin crime boss Martin Cahill, although in both cases it was recovered.

== Description ==
The work shows a middle-class woman attended by a housemaid who is presumably acting as messenger and go-between for the lady and her lover. The work is seen as a bridge between the quiet restraint and self-containment of Vermeer's work of the 1660s and his relatively cooler work of the 1670s. It may have been partly inspired by Ter Borch's painting Woman Sealing a Letter. The painting's canvas was almost certainly cut from the same bolt used for Woman with a Lute.

Lady Writing a Letter with her Maid is the first of the artist's experiments with centrifugal composition; where the focus is not only on the centre of the canvas. In addition, it is his third work in which the drama and dynamic are not centred on a single figure. The maid is shown standing in the mid-ground, behind her lady, with her hands crossed and waiting for the letter to be completed. The positions of their bodies indicate that the two women are disconnected. The folded arms of the maid seem outwardly as an attempt to display a sense of self-containment, however she is detached from her lady both emotionally and psychologically. The maid's gaze towards the half-visible window indicates an inner restlessness and boredom, as she waits impatiently for the messenger to carry her lady's letter away. Some art historians dispute the absoluteness of this view; according to Pascal Bonafoux, while complicity is not "indicated by a look or a smile" from either woman, the mere fact of her presence during such an intimate act as the composition of a love letter indicates at least a degree of intimacy between the two.

The painting contains many of Vermeer's usual painterly motifs; in particular his obsession with the inside/outside axis of interior spaces, and through his depiction of the tiled floor and the verticals of the dresses, window frame and back wall painting, his interest in geometry and abstract forms, recalling his earlier View of Delft, The Lacemaker and The Art of Painting.

== History ==
Lady Writing was stolen on 27 April 1974, along with a Goya, two Gainsboroughs and three Rubens from Russborough House, the home of Sir Alfred Beit, by armed members of the IRA. Led by the British heiress Rose Dugdale, the thieves used screwdrivers to cut the paintings from their frames. However, the Vermeer and other works were recovered eight days later at a cottage in County Cork.

It was again taken in 1986 by a gang led by the Dublin gangster Martin Cahill. Along with a number of other artworks, Cahill held the painting for a ransom of IR£20 million. However, the money was not paid, and Cahill lacked contacts or knowledge to otherwise pass it on to international art thieves. According to a RTÉ report, Cahill's taste in art extended only to "cheery scenes like the cheap print in his living room of swans on a river, but he believed the stolen masterpieces would bring him a fortune." The painting was eventually recovered during an August 1993 exchange at Antwerp airport which turned out to be a sting operation organised by the Irish police. It had already been donated in absentia to the National Gallery in Dublin.

== Sources ==
- Bonafoux, Pascal. Vermeer. New York: Konecky & Konecky, 1992. ISBN 1-56852-308-4
- Hart, Matthew. The Irish Game. London: Random House, 2004. ISBN 0-09-947457-3
- Huerta, Robert. Vermeer and Plato: Painting the Ideal. Bucknell University Press, 2005. ISBN 0-8387-5606-9
- Pollock, Griselda. Differencing the canon. Routledge, 1999. ISBN 0-415-06699-9
- Wheelock, Arthur K. Vermeer: The Complete Works. New York: Harry N. Abrams, 1997. ISBN 0-8109-2751-9
