= Castletroy =

Suburb of Limerick city, Ireland

Castletroy Caladh an Treoigh
- Suburb
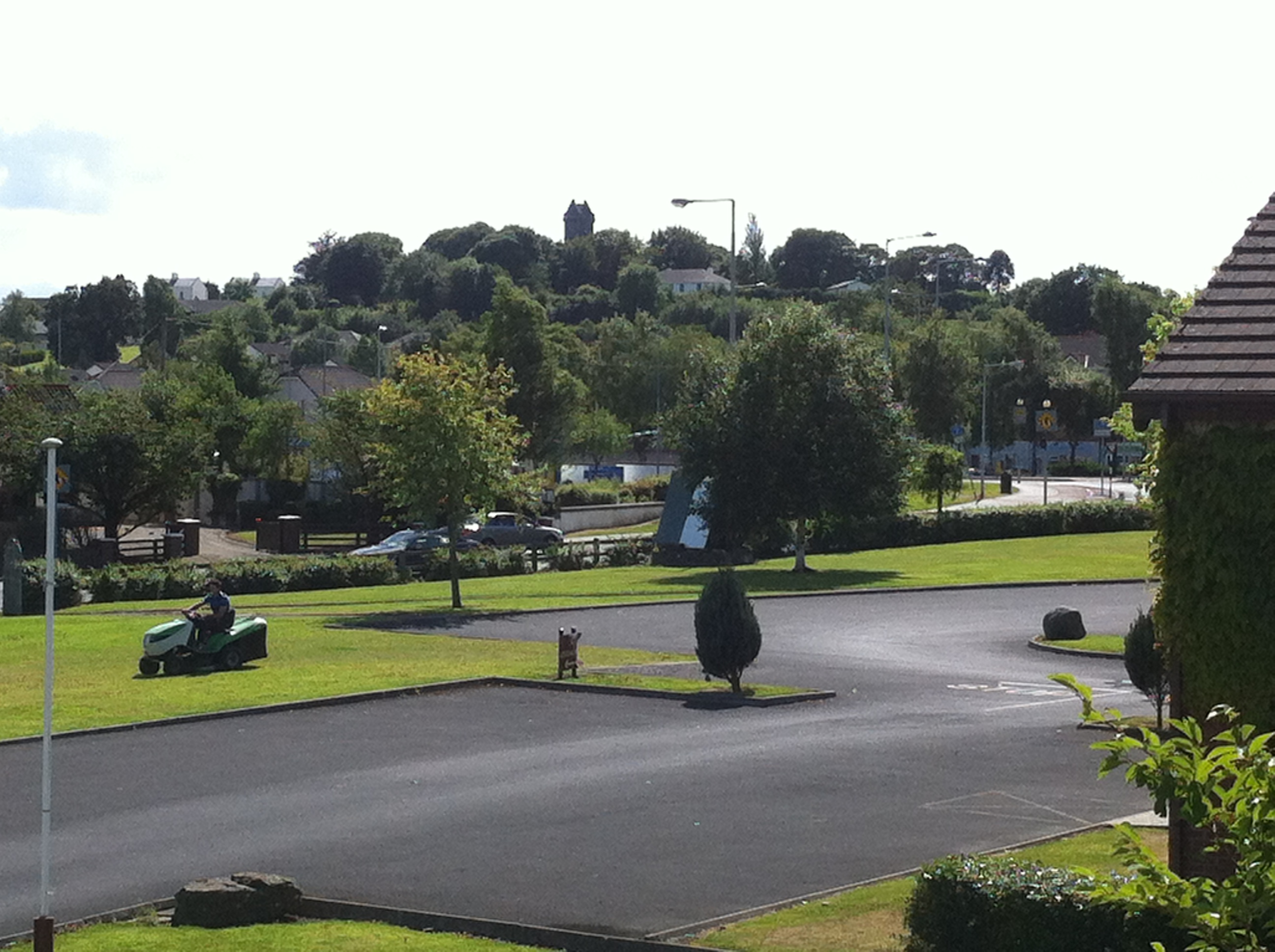
- Housing (Monaleen Heights) in Castletroy

- Location in Ireland
- Coordinates: 52°40′01″N 8°33′11″W
- Country: Ireland
- Province: Munster
- City: Limerick

Population (2016)
  - Total: 14,733
- (Area covered by 2018 Castletroy Local Area Plan, including Annacotty village)
- Time zone: UTC+0 (WET)
  - Summer (DST): UTC-1 (IST (WEST))
- Irish Grid Reference: R 625 574

Castletroy (Irish: Caladh an Treoigh, meaning 'callow (riverside meadow) of An Treoch or de Treo') is a townland and suburb of Limerick, Ireland. The area was named after Castle Troy, also known as the Black Castle, the ruins of which are located on the southern bank of the River Shannon, approximately 2 km east of the University of Limerick.

== History ==
Evidence of ancient settlement in the area includes a number of tower house, bawn and ringfort sites in the townlands of Castletroy, Newcastle and Rivers. The tower house from which the area gets its name, the castle of Caladh an Treoigh, was built on the south bank of the River Shannon and was described by Thomas Johnson Westropp as being ruined since at least the 17th century.

The name Castletroy may, however, predate the castle itself as the area may have been used by the O'Turrain clan. The O'Turrain clan, who were no longer in the area by the time the castle was built, may have used it as a safe harbour for navigating the river.

Castleroy's former Board of First Fruits Church of Ireland church, built in 1812, is now used as an arts and heritage centre.

For much of the 20th century, the Castletroy area was separate to Limerick city, and consisted of little development aside from the villages of Annacotty and Monaleen. From the 1970s, following the development of University of Limerick on the former grounds of Plassey House, the area began to grow as a residential suburb. Kilbane, Castletroy Heights, Monaleen Heights and Monaleen Park were among the first housing developments built in the area. The suburb of Castletroy has since expanded to include the villages of Annacotty and Monaleen (from móin an lín, meaning bogland of the flax).

Until June 2014, Castletroy and the neighbouring suburbs were not within the city boundary. The amalgamation of the two local authorities in Limerick in 2014, which resulted in the formation of the combined Limerick City and County Council, saw all areas of Limerick (city and county) come under a single authority for the first time. The merger of the authorities saw the city area expanded to include several urban areas, like Castletroy, within the Limerick Metropolitan District.

== Amenities ==
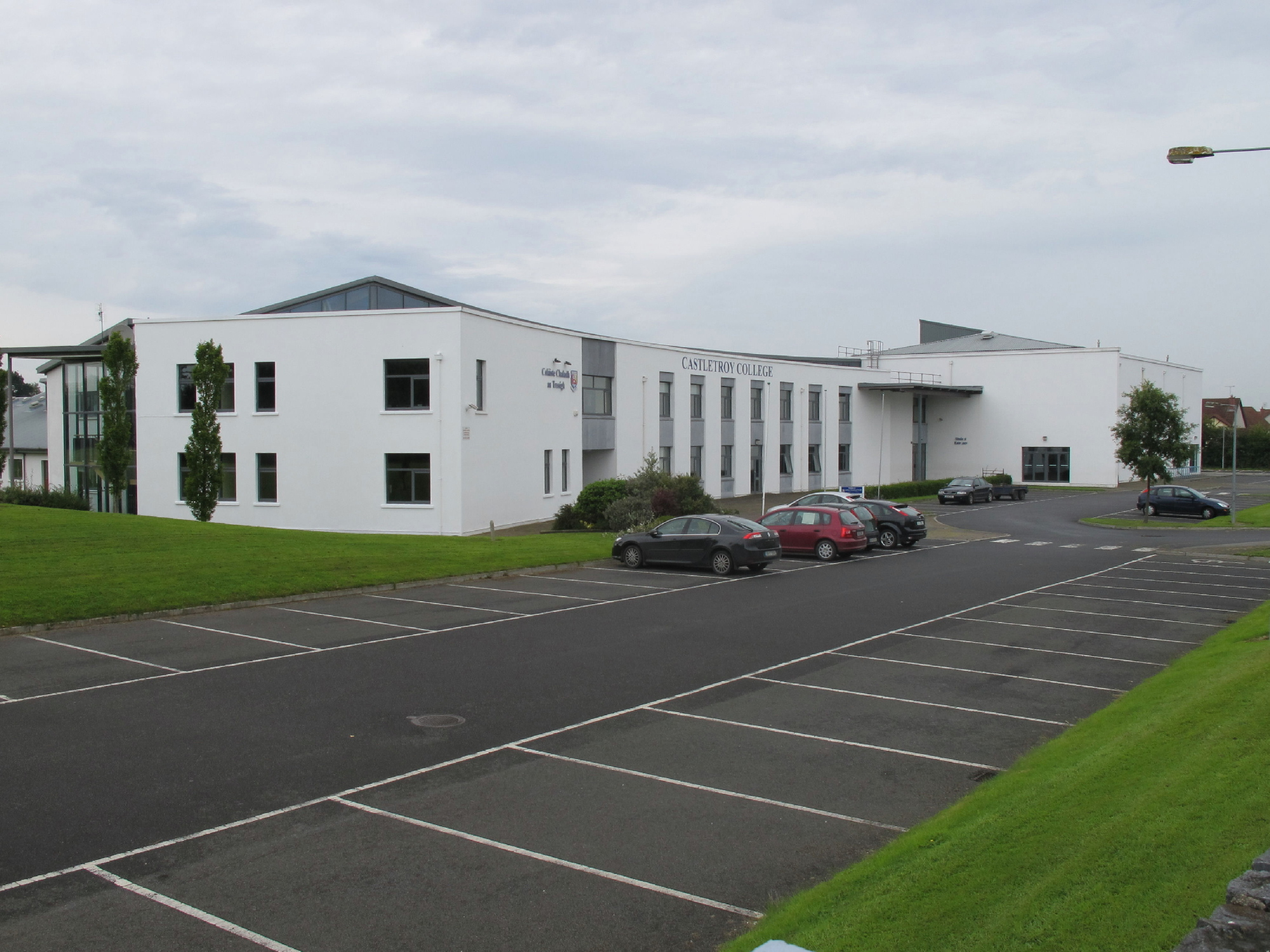
Castletroy College

Castletroy has two national (primary) schools (Milford NS and Monaleen NS), a Gaelscoil (Gaelscoil Chaladh an Treoigh) and a secondary school (Castletroy College).

The area is home to two Gaelic Athletic Association (GAA) clubs: Milford GAA and Monaleen GAA. Castletroy Golf Course divides Monaleen and Castletroy itself. A local park has also been built including a children's playground and skatepark.

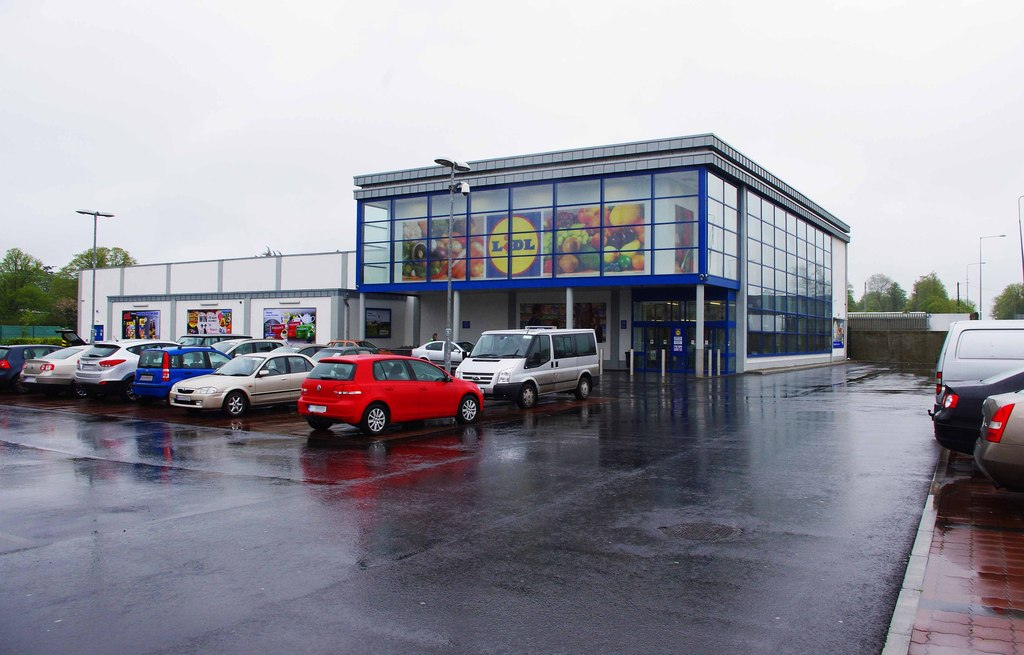
Lidl outlet in Castletroy

A shopping centre, known as Castletroy Town Centre, is located off Dublin Road at Kilmurry. It is anchored by a SuperValu supermarket and contains over 20 other shops, a McDonald's restaurant and an eight-screen Odeon cinema. Lidl also has a branch in Castletroy. There are several hotels in the area.

The National Technology Park in Castletroy is home to several businesses such as Vistakon (a contact lens division of Johnson & Johnson) and Viagogo (an online ticket marketplace). The Chicago-based financial institution Northern Trust also has an office in City East Plaza in Castletroy.

== Places of interest ==
=== Castle Troy or the Black Castle ===
Located on the southern bank of the River Shannon, roughly 2 km east of the University of Limerick, Castle Troy was erected in the 13th century by a member of the O'Brien family. Originally built during the reign of Henry III (1216-1272), the castle later became the seat of the MacKeoghs, who were often in conflict with neighbouring chiefs. The MacKeoghs continued to hold land in Castletroy, but at some point before the reign of Elizabeth I, the castle was taken over by their overlord, the Earl of Desmond. The Earl of Desmond rebelled against the English monarchy and, following the Desmond Rebellions, their lands were forfeit and Castle Troy became the property of Sir John Bourke of Brittas.

According to tradition, when Oliver Cromwell landed in 1649, his general Henry Ireton led an army on Limerick in 1651 and set up cannons on Harty's Hill and battered the castle. Described as a ruin by at least the mid-17th century, Castle Troy was granted to James Duke of York in 1666 and later sold to the Hollow Blade Company in 1703.

Castletroy Castle's history is recounted in verse in Hogan's "Lays, Legends of Thomond":

Lo! grey Castletroy by war,
Tide and time batter'd Stands,
like an old chief With his armour all shatter'd
As if musing, in gloomy and gaunt desolation
On the red feudal days
When Green Erin was a Nation.
There the warlike Mac keoghs,
In their power and revell'd
And often in fight
Were their sounding spears levell'd
'Till Cromwell, the fiend, with his
Tower-cleaving cannon,
Ploughed their strong castle walls
On the brink of the Shannon".

=== Jewish graveyard ===
There is a small Jewish graveyard in Castletroy. It dates from the late 19th century when Limerick had a sizable Jewish community. While Limerick's Jewish population waned from the early 20th century, a number of Jewish people lived in Castletroy into the 1980s. The graveyard was renovated and reopened by Chief Rabbi Mervis in 1990.

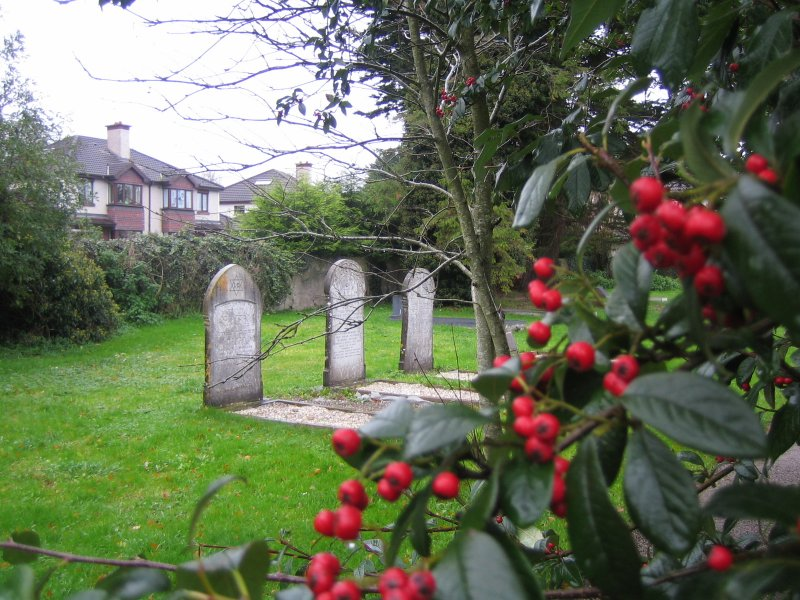
Castletroy's Jewish graveyard

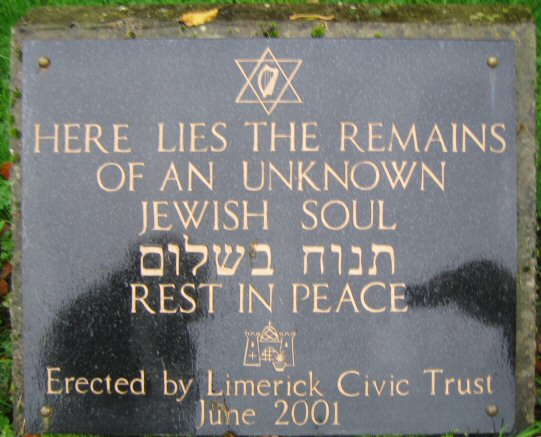
Grave of an "Unknown Jewish Soul" of Limerick
