= Antonia Zárate =

Spanish actress

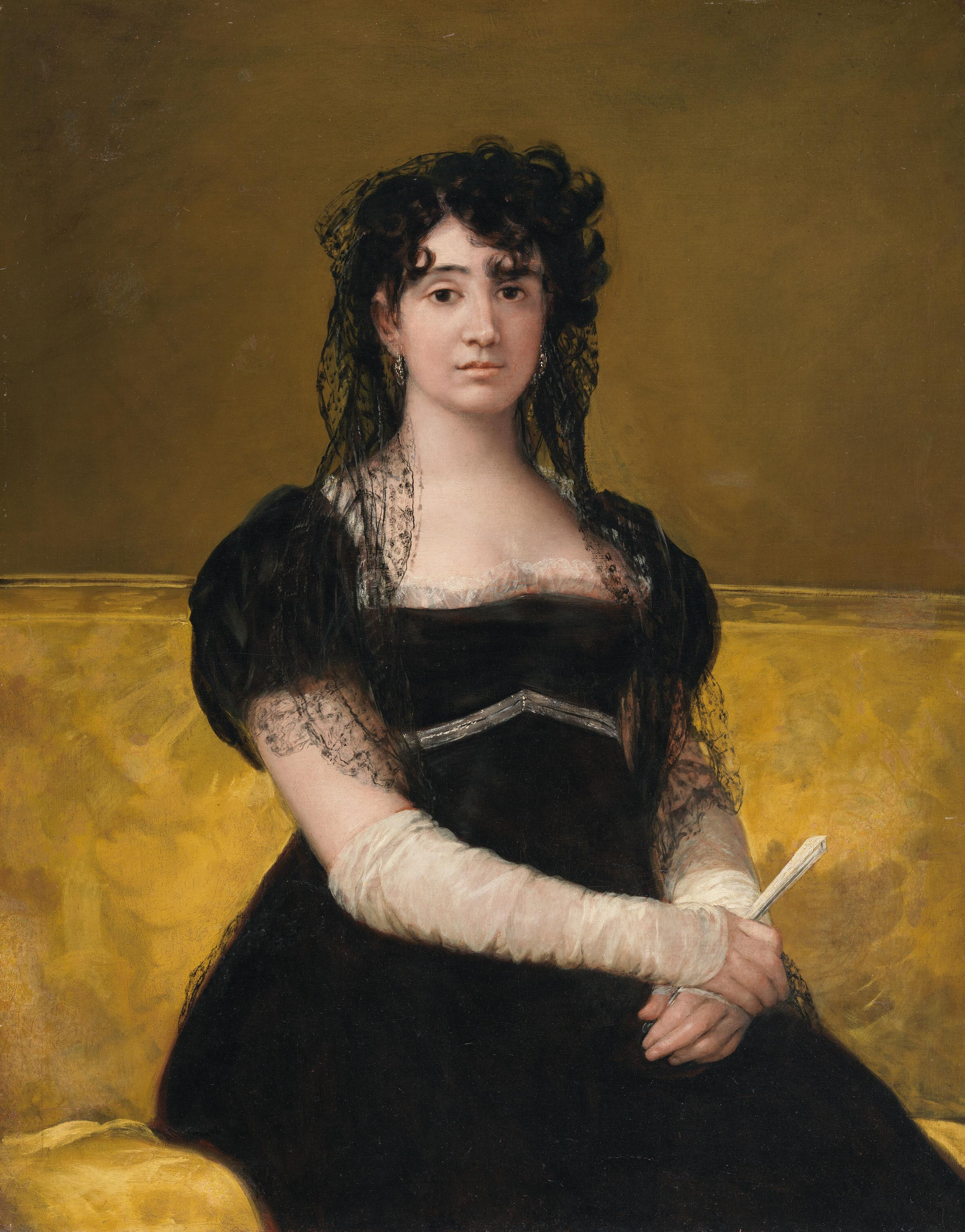
Zárate by Goya, 1805

Antonia Zárate (1775–1811) was a Spanish actress.

== Life ==
Zárate was born Antonia de Aguirre y Murguía in 1775 in Barcelona], and her birth name reveals her family's Basque origins. She was the daughter of the actor Pedro de Zárate Valdés, director of a company which was performing "in the lands of Aragón" at the time of her birth She seems to have arrived in Cádiz at the end of the 18th century. Cotarelo followed her progress in the Madrid theatres – she had success throughout Spain, but mainly acted in the Spanish capital. She is mentioned in 1797 as being in Madrid with Rita Luna and Isidoro Máiquez in Luis Navarro's company, contracted to the Coliseo de la Cruz. A year later Cotarelo mentions her singing with Manuela Correa and the same company, now at the Coliseo del Príncipe. She was still there in the 1801-02 season, mentioned as a 'matron of serious character' and a year after that she is recorded as working at the Teatro de los Caños del Peral as part of the opera and verse company led by Máiquez, Antonia Prado and other major Spanish actors of the period.

Zárate was a friend of Francisco Goya, who painted her in 1805 (the work is now in the National Gallery of Ireland) and possibly again in 1810–1811. She married the singer and comic actor Bernardo Gil y Aguado. In Madrid in 1793 she gave birth her only child, Antonio Gil y Zárate, who later became a poet and playwright. She died of tuberculosis and had probably separated from her husband by then, since she makes Manuel García de la Prada her sole executor and sole heir in her will.
