= Charley Hill (detective) =

Art crime investigator (1947–2021)

- Born: Patrick Charles Landon Hill; May 22, 1947; Cambridge, UK
- Died: February 20, 2021 (aged 73); London, UK
- Other name: Chris Roberts
- Education: Trinity College, Hartford; Trinity College Dublin; King's College London
- Occupations: Detective; private investigator; soldier
- Police career
- Department: Art and Antiques Unit
- Branch: Metropolitan Police
- Military service
- Allegiance: United States
- Branch: United States Army
- Service years: 1968–9
- Unit: 173rd Airborne Brigade

Charles Patrick Landon Hill (born Patrick Charles Landon Hill; 22 May 1947 – 20 February 2021) was a British-American art crime investigator and Vietnam veteran. He is best known for recovering Edvard Munch's The Scream three months after it was stolen. Hill also played a crucial role in the recovery of many of the paintings stolen by Martin Cahill from Russborough House.

== Early life ==
Patrick Charles Landon Hill was born in Cambridge to Zita, a ballerina, and Landon Hill, a captain in the U.S. Air Force. The family frequently relocated between Britain, Germany, and the United States. He later switched his first and middle names, preferring to be called Charles instead of Patrick. Hill attended schools in Texas, London, Colorado, and Frankfurt, before finally settling in Washington, D.C., where he attended St. Albans School before entering Trinity College in Hartford, Connecticut.

== Vietnam War ==
In 1968, Hill dropped out of college and volunteered to fight as a paratrooper in the Vietnam War with the 173rd Airborne Brigade, despite his opposition to the war. During a raid on an enemy encampment, Hill and two fellow soldiers found it deserted except for a wounded elderly Montagnard man, who had likely guided North Vietnamese troops through the mountain passes. Hill's companions intended to kill the man, but Hill intervened and saved his life.

When his tour of duty ended, Hill departed from that regiment's November platoon and returned home to Washington, D.C. After his service in Vietnam, he transitioned from working as a security guard to studying history at George Washington University in 1971. His academic performance earned him a Fulbright scholarship to study history at Trinity College Dublin. Following this, he taught high school in Belfast and pursued further studies in theology at King's College London.

== Metropolitan Police ==
After joining London's Metropolitan Police in 1978, his career in law enforcement evolved into undercover work, particularly focusing on art-related cases. He spent over two decades at the Art and Antiques Unit. During investigations, he often disguised himself as an illegal art dealer with a Mid-Atlantic accent. Hill played a crucial role in recovering many of the eighteen paintings stolen in 1986 from Russborough House by mob boss Martin Cahill.

=== The Scream recovery ===
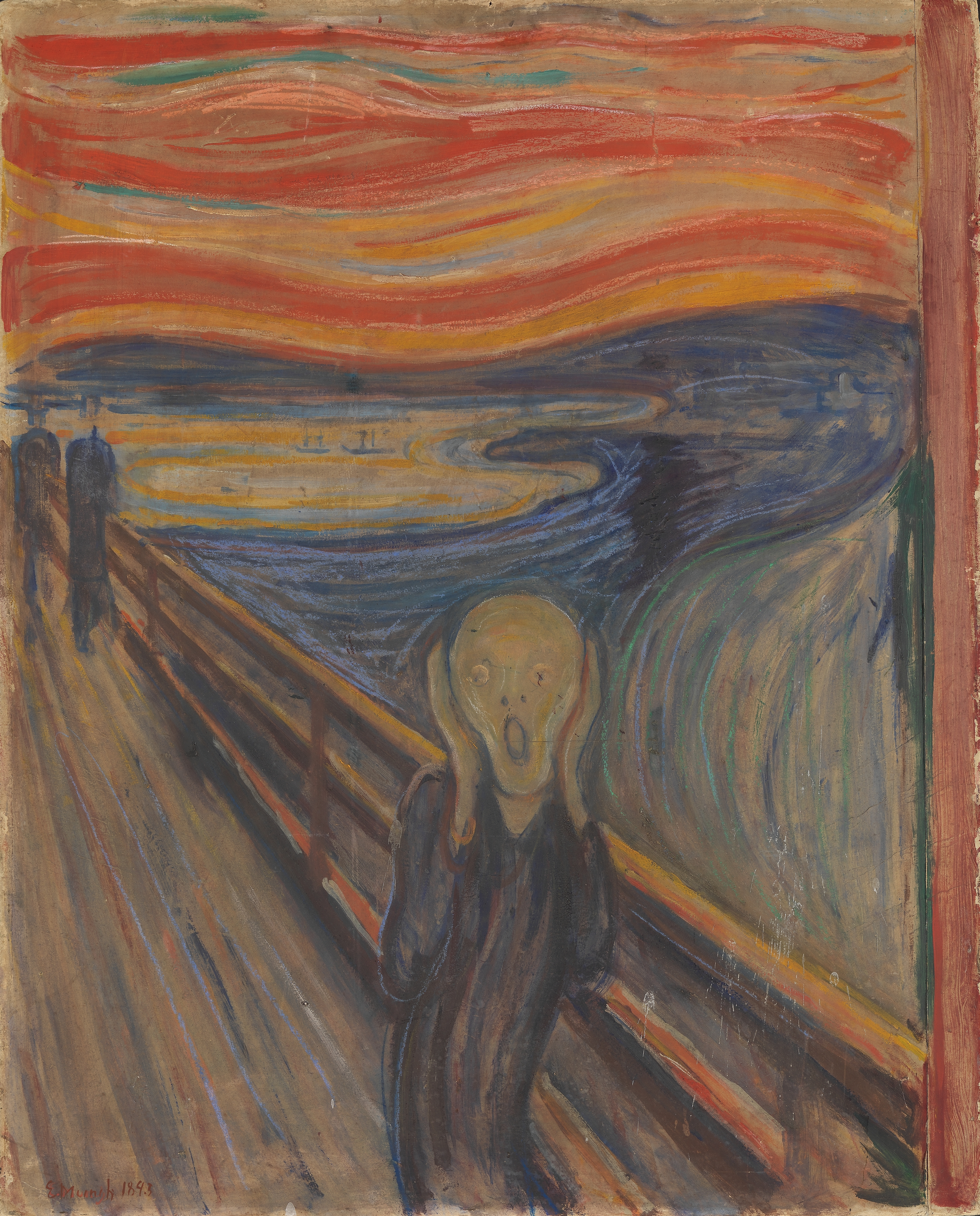
The Scream by Edvard Munch

Hill played a pivotal role in the recovery of The Scream after its theft from the National Gallery in Oslo in 1994. Norwegian authorities extradited an English prisoner to the UK to complete the remaining five years of their sentence. Upon their release on parole, they contacted the Norwegian embassy in London, claiming they had obtained information about the theft through connections made while incarcerated in Norway. Given the absence of an art crime department in Norway, the Norwegian authorities enlisted Hill to assist in the case.

The former prisoner facilitated communication between British and Norwegian authorities, enabling Scotland Yard to gain a credible lead in the case. Over three months, Hill, using the alias Chris Roberts, posed as a Getty Museum representative and interacted with intermediaries linked to the Norwegian thieves. Hill convinced them that the Getty Museum would pay £500,000 for the return of the painting. Gaining their trust and luring them with money, they arranged a meeting at a summer house in Åsgårdstrand on the Oslofjord. Without carrying a weapon, he attended the meeting where The Scream was found hidden in the basement, leading to the painting's recovery and the arrest of the accomplices by local police.

== Later life and death ==
After twenty years in the police force, he resigned and worked as a private investigator. In 1993, Hill worked on recovering Lady Writing a Letter with her Maid by Johannes Vermeer in Paris. He posed as an art dealer and traveled to a Belgian parking lot to retrieve the painting. In 1996, he collaborated with Czech and German authorities to recover a collection of paintings and statues stolen from the National Gallery Prague, including Lucas Cranach's The Old Fool.

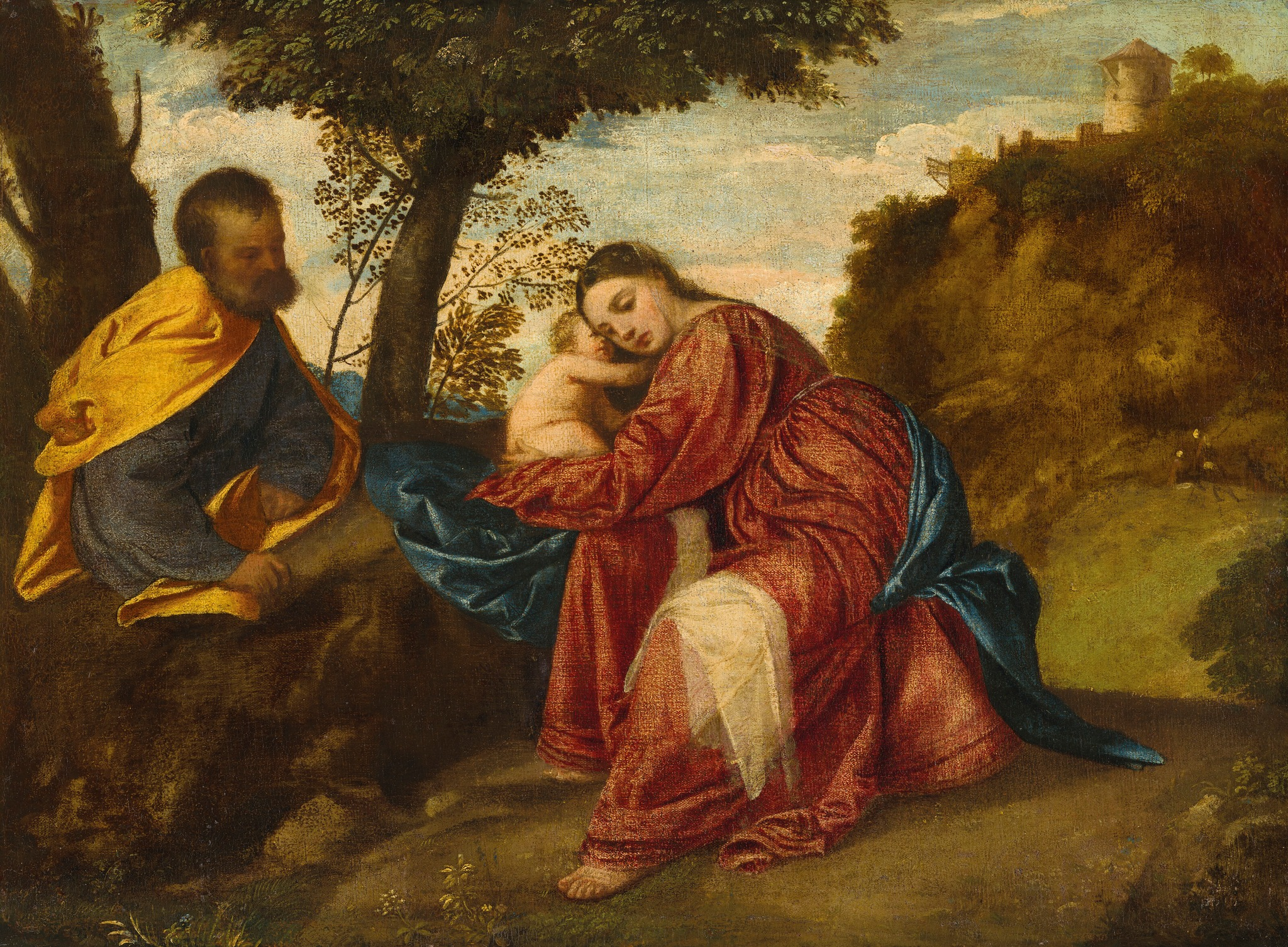
Rest on the Flight into Egypt by Titian

In 2002, Hill led the search that resulted in the discovery of Titian's Rest on the Flight into Egypt, a painting stolen in 1995 from a drawing room at Longleat House in England. After offering a £100,000 reward in exchange for a tip-off, it was found in a plastic shopping bag at a bus stop in London. In addition to the Vermeer, he assisted in recovering Francisco Goya's Portrait of Doña Antonia Zárate and pledged that he would locate the remaining stolen paintings.

In 2020, his efforts to recover three Rembrandts, five Degas, a Manet and a Vermeer that were stolen 30 years ago from the Isabella Stewart Gardner Museum in Boston, were documented in the BBC Four documentary The Billion Dollar Art Hunt.

In 2021, Hill died in a London hospital at age 73 from a torn aorta following unsuccessful surgery.

== Gallery ==
Selected works recovered by Hill
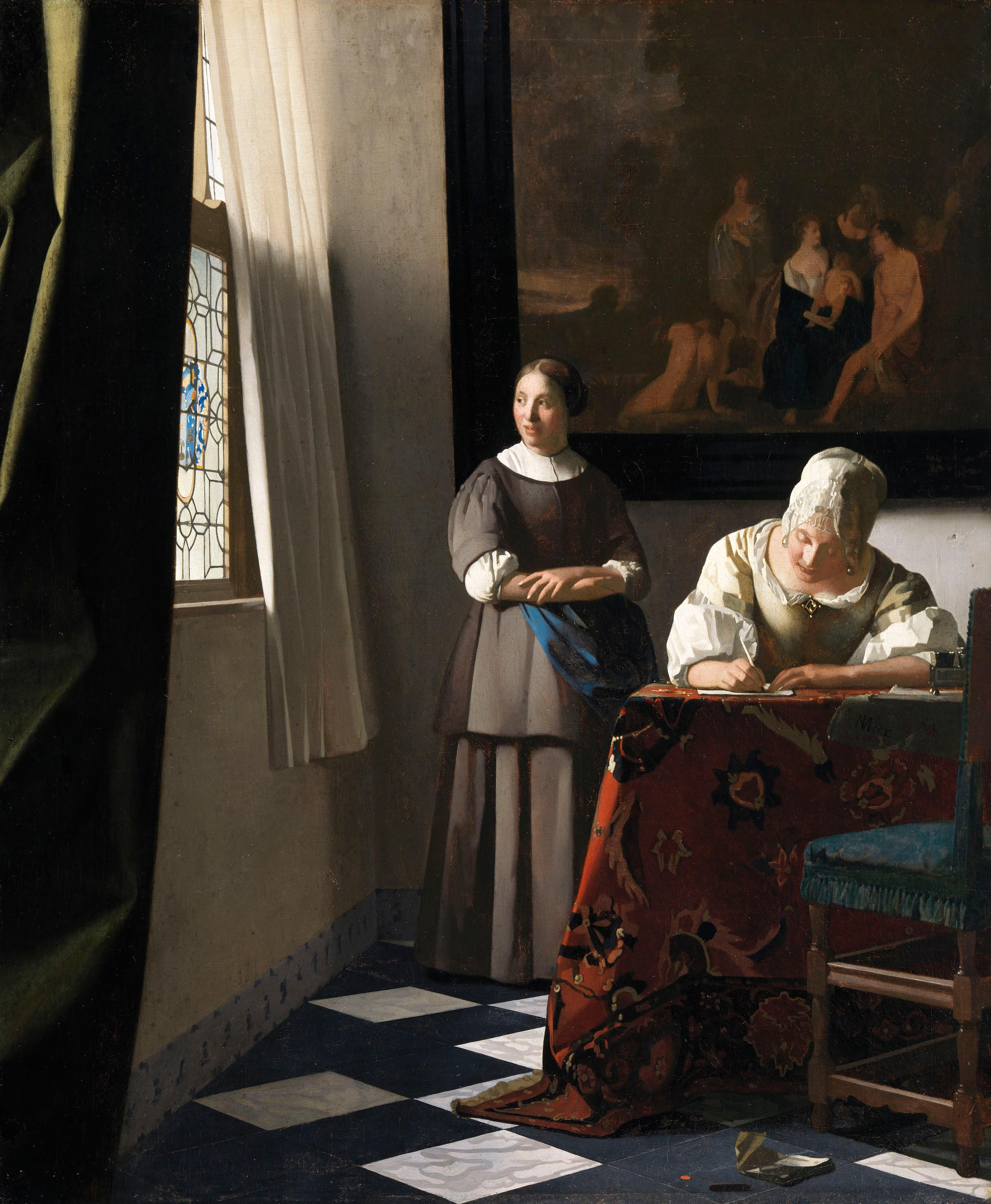
Lady Writing a Letter with her Maid by Johannes Vermeer

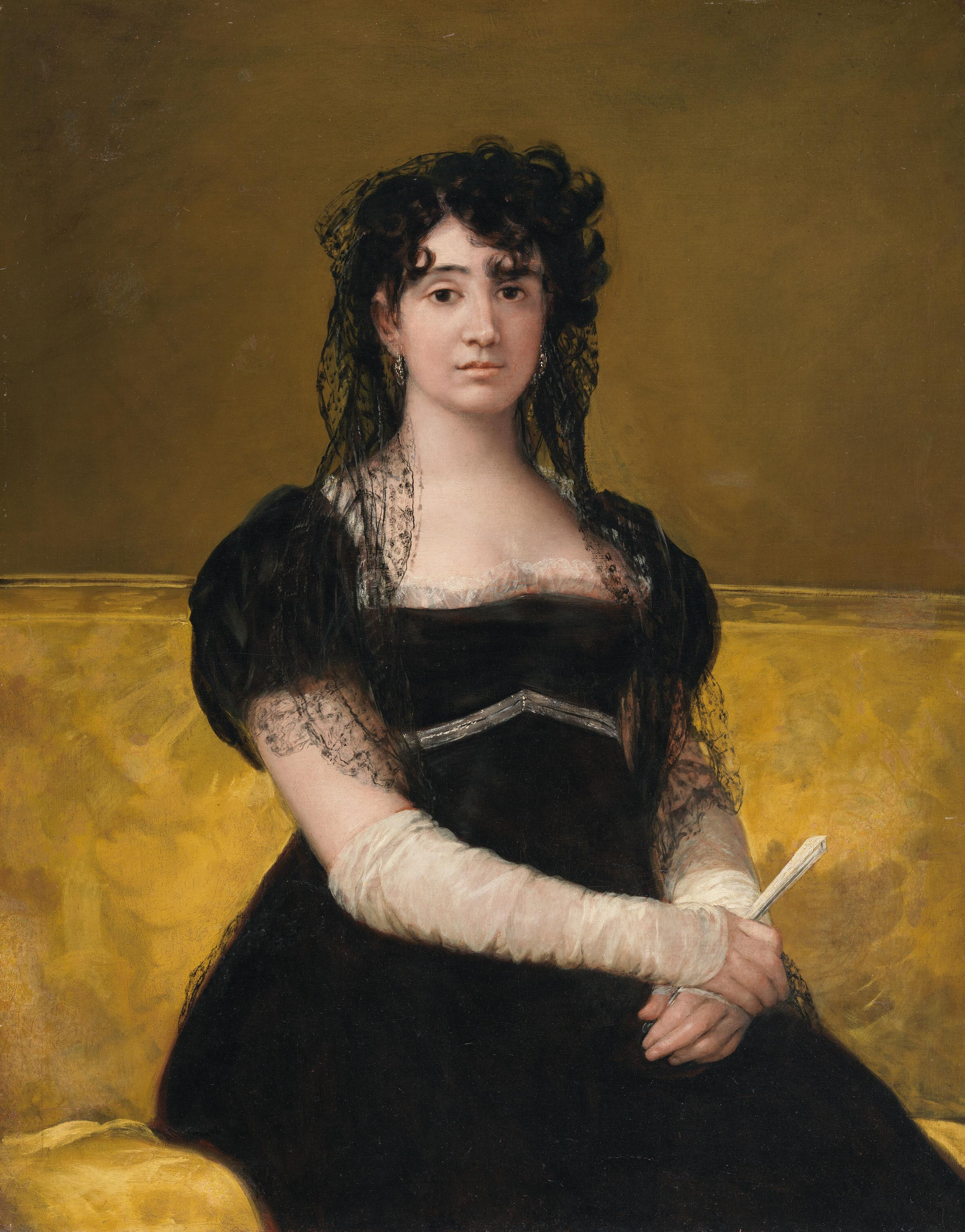
Portrait of Doña Antonia Zárate by Francisco Goya

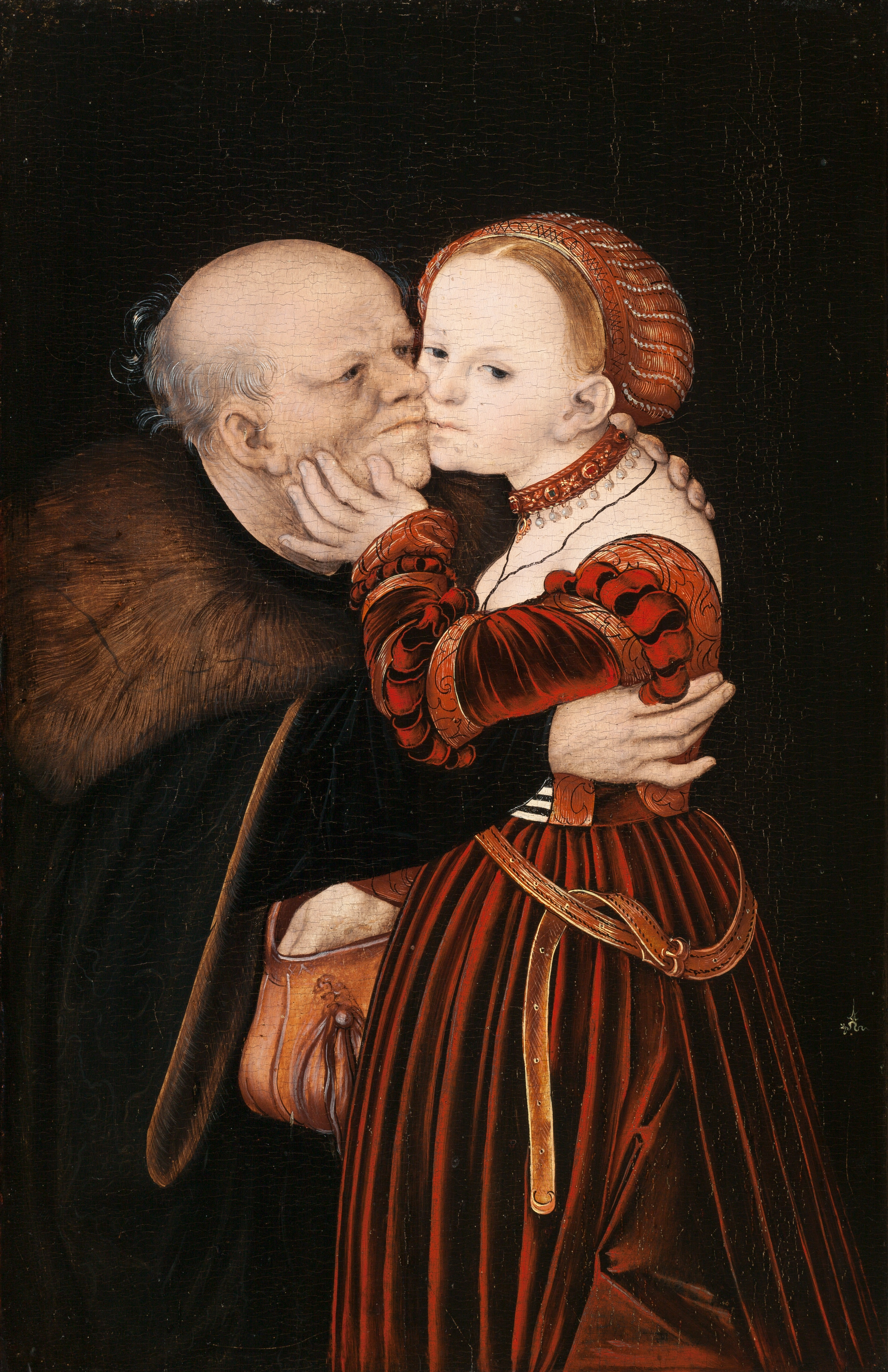
The Old Fool by Lucas Cranach
