= Portrait of Doña Antonia Zárate (1810–1811) =

Painting by Francisco Goya

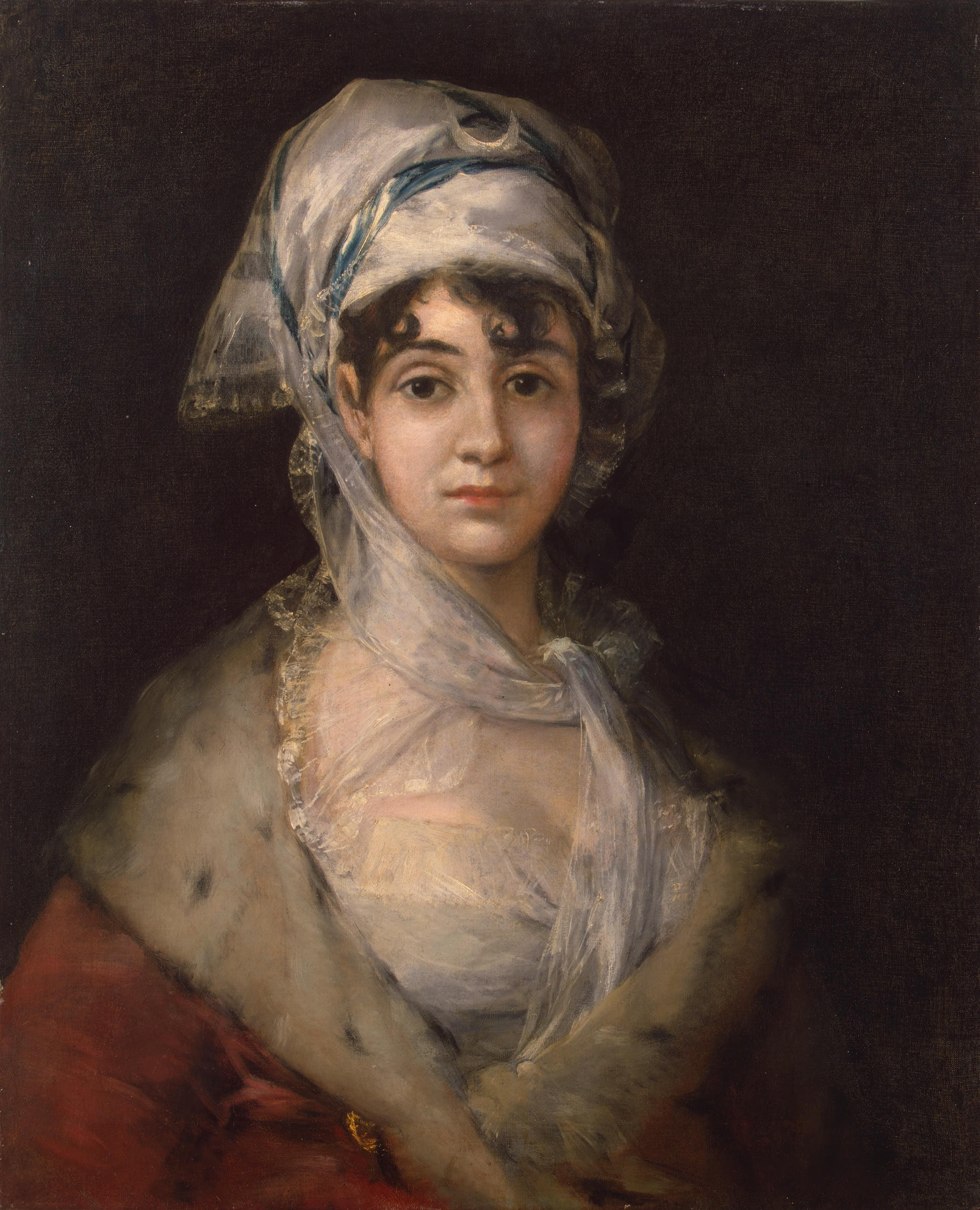
- Artist: Francisco Goya
- Year: 1810–1811
- Dimensions: 71 cm × 58 cm (28 in × 23 in)
- Location: Hermitage Museum; Saint Petersburg

The Portrait of Doña Antonia Zárate is an 1810–1811 painting of the actress Antonia Zárate by Francisco Goya or his studio. It is now in the Hermitage Museum, and if it is an autograph work, it is the only painting by Goya in a Russian collection.

It seems to have been commissioned by the subject's son Antonio Gil y Zárate in 1811 after her death and probably forms a reworking of Goya's earlier larger 1805 portrait of her. It remained in Spain until 1900, when it was sold in New York City. It passed through various dealers and owners before being acquired by the Knoedler Gallery for $60,000 from an heir of Marshall Field, a department-store magnate in Chicago. That gallery was owned by Armand Hammer, who then used a Liechtenstein front to sell it to his own Armand Hammer Foundation for $160,000. In 1972, Hammer donated it to the Hermitage, claiming it was worth $1,000,000.

== See also ==
- List of works by Francisco Goya

== Bibliography ==
- Bavilsky, Dmitry (November 27, 2014). Невозможность путешествий [The Inability to Travel] (in Russian). Новое Литературное Обозрение. ISBN 9785444803257.
- "Новый мир" [New World] (in Russian) (5–6). Izvesti︠i︡a Sovety deputatov Trud︠i︡ashchikhs︠i︡a SSSR. 2007.
