= Rest on the Flight into Egypt (Titian) =

c. 1512 painting by Titian

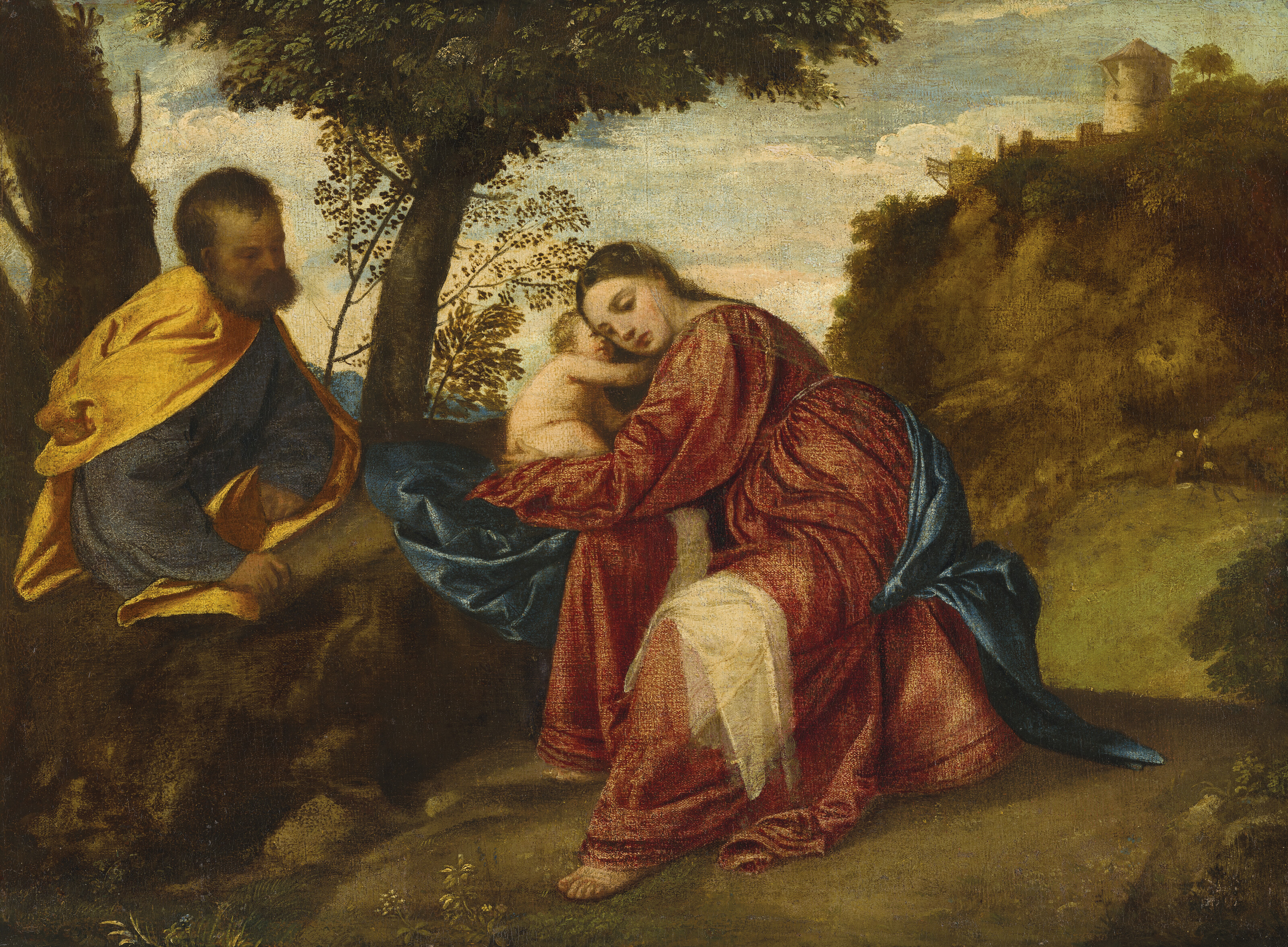
- Artist: Titian
- Year: c. 1508
- Medium: oil paint on wood-mounted canvas
- Subject: Rest on the Flight into Egypt
- Dimensions: 46.5 cm × 64 cm (18.3 in × 25 in)
- Location: Private collection

Rest on the Flight into Egypt is a c. 1508 oil on panel painting by Titian, owned by the Marquess of Bath and held at Longleat House near Warminster, Wiltshire, England. The artwork portrays Joseph, Mary, and Jesus as they stop to rest during their flight into Egypt.

== Description ==
The painting is mounted on a wooden panel 64 cm wide and is believed to have been made by Titian in about 1508, when he was 20 years old.

== Provenance ==
In the early 17th century, the painting was documented in the possession of a Venetian spice merchant. By the 1660s it was in the collection of the Archduke Leopold Wilhelm of Austria, where it was included in the catalogue titled Theatrum Pictorium by his court painter David Teniers the Younger. In 1809, it was stolen from Belvedere Palace in Vienna by French troops during the Napoleonic Wars. It was purchased from Christie's by the 4th Marquess of Bath in 1878 and has since been at the family residence, Longleat House. It was stolen from the drawing room there in 1995 and was recovered in Richmond, London in 2002 by the art detective Charley Hill.

The painting was auctioned by Christie's on July 7, 2024 for $22.3 million.

== Copies ==
In addition to the engraving for the catalogue of the Archduke's collection, Teniers made a miniature of the painting. As with most of his miniatures, it is unclear whether the engraving was made after the miniature or the original; in the case of Rest on the Flight into Egypt, the current literature points to both the miniature and the engraving having been made from the original.

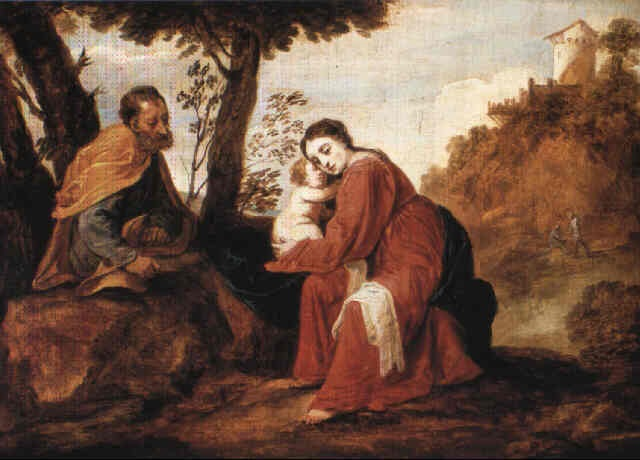
Miniature copy by Teniers

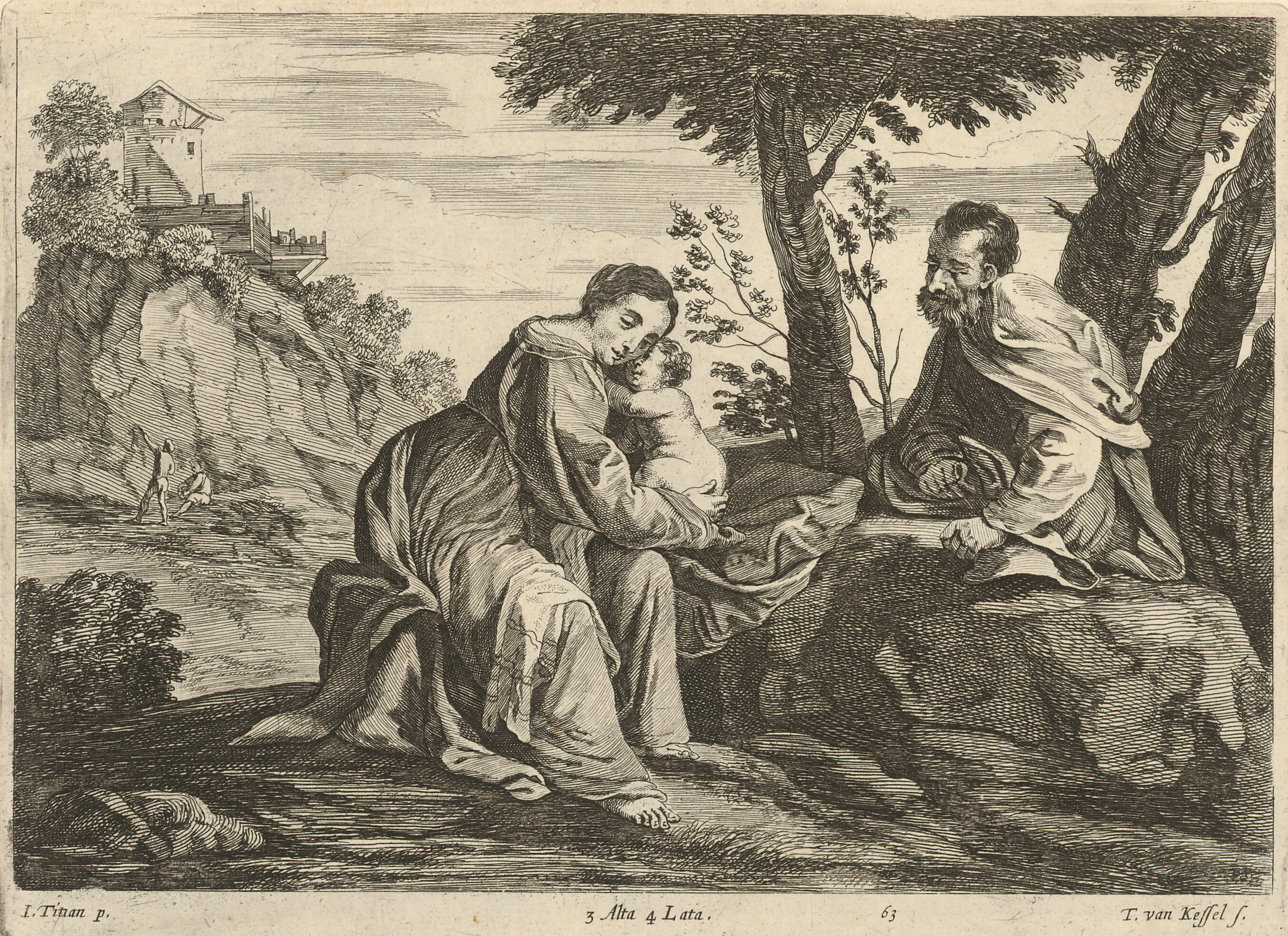
Engraving for the Theatrum Pictorium by Theodoor van Kessel

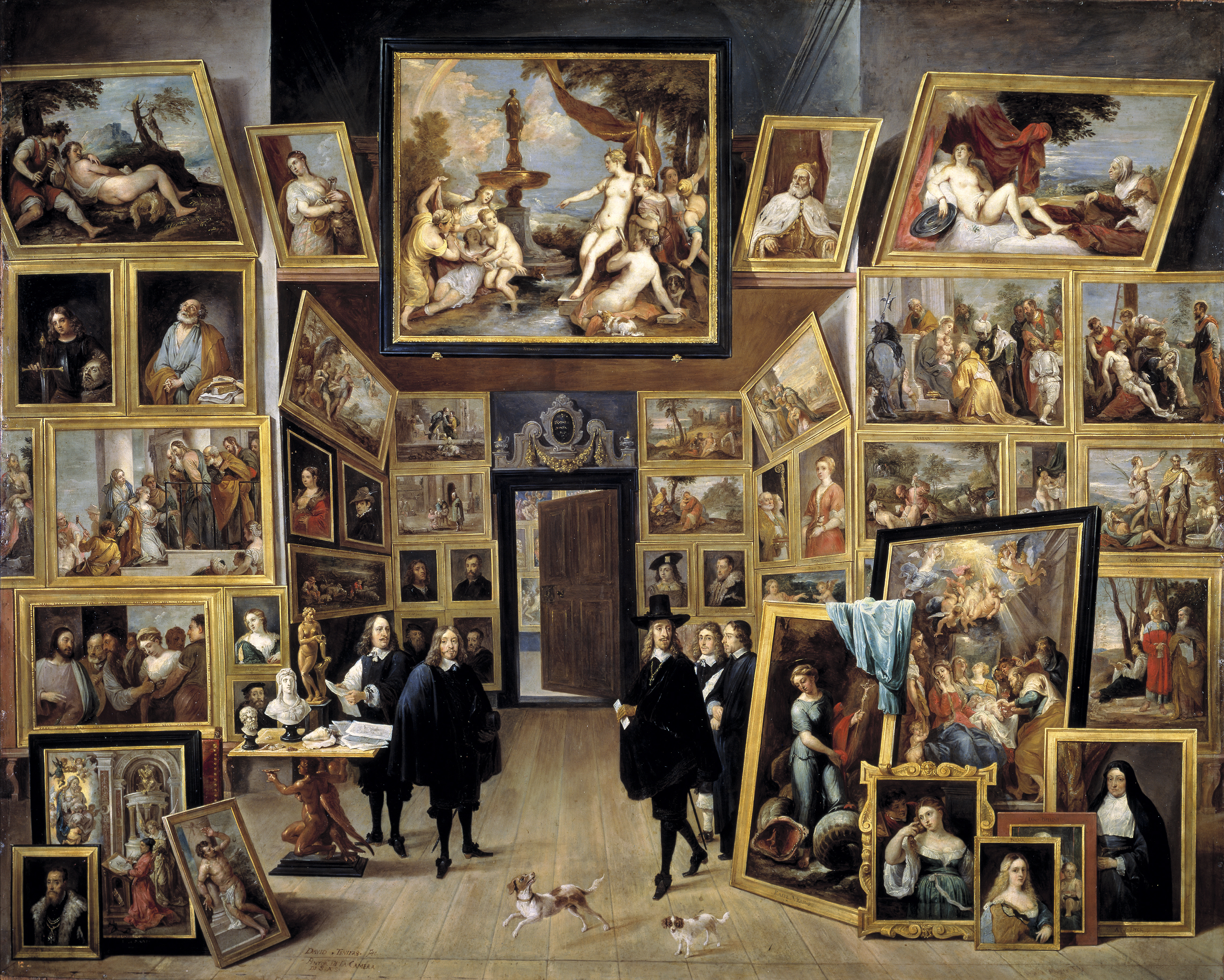
The Archduke Leopold Wilhelm in his Painting Gallery in Brussels by Teniers; Rest on the Flight into Egypt can be seen to the right of the door.

== See also ==
- List of works by Titian
