= Zaratite =

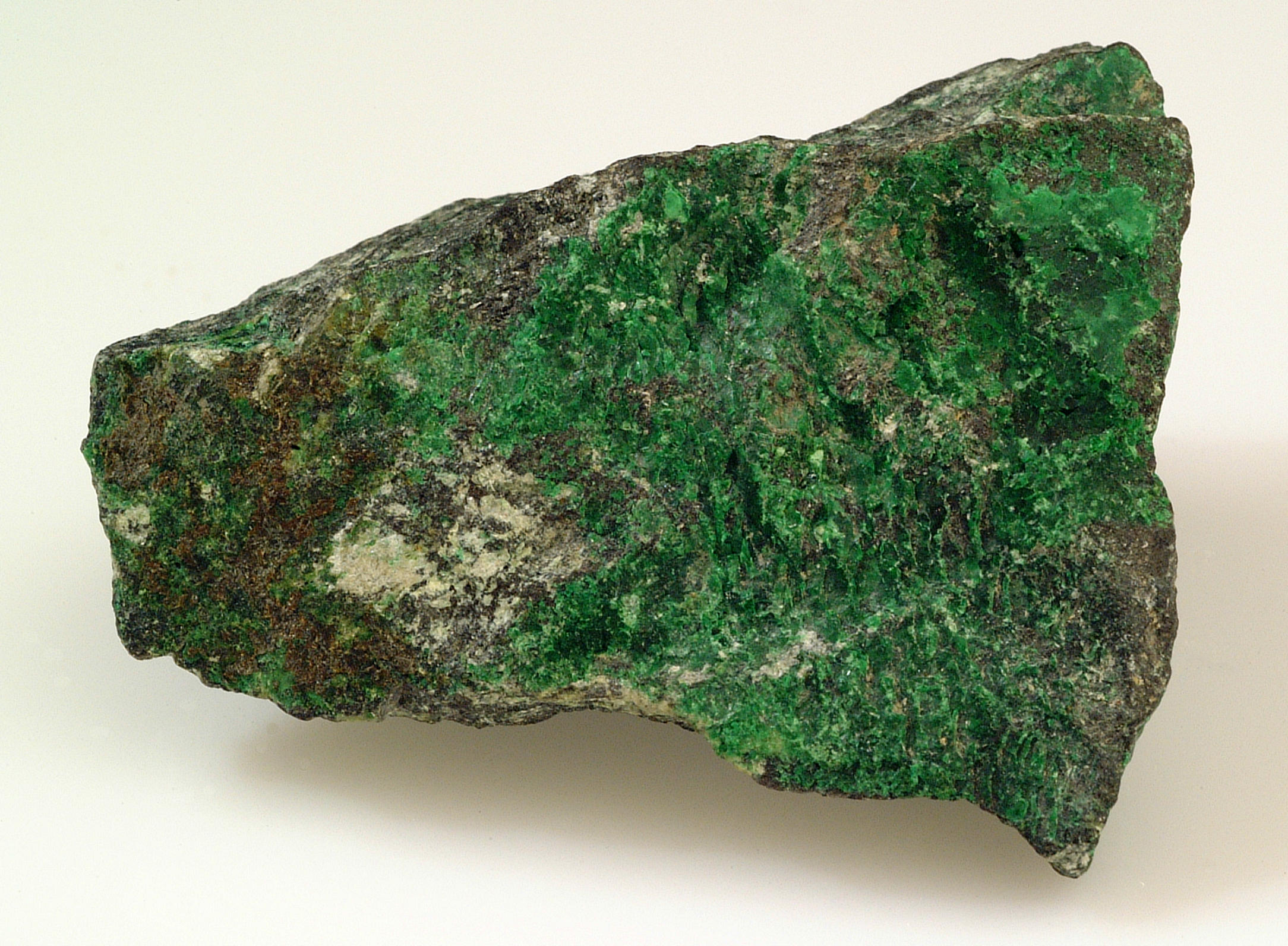
- Zaratite from Tasmania

General
- Category: Carbonates
- Formula: Ni_{3}CO_{3}(OH)_{4}·4H_{2}O
- IMA symbol: Zar
- Strunz classification: 5.DA.70
- Crystal system: Isometric (in part amorphous)
- Unit cell: a = 6.16 Å; Z = 1

Identification

Zaratite is a bright emerald green nickel carbonate mineral with formula Ni_{3}CO_{3}(OH)_{4}·4H_{2}O. Zaratite crystallizes in the isometric crystal system as massive to mammillary encrustations and vein fillings. It has a specific gravity of 2.6 and a Mohs hardness of 3 to 3.5. It has no cleavage and is brittle to conchoidal fracture. The luster is vitreous to greasy.

It is a rare secondary mineral formed by hydration or alteration of the primary nickel and iron bearing minerals, chromite, pentlandite, pyrrhotite, and millerite, during the serpentinization of ultramafic rocks. Hellyerite, NiCO_{3}·6H_{2}O, is a related mineral. It was found originally in Manolita mine, Teixedelo, Cedeira, La Coruña province, Galicia, Spain in 1851, and named after Spanish diplomat and dramatist Antonio Gil y Zárate (1793–1861).

== See also ==
- Nickel(II) carbonate
