= Sylvester Primer =

American linguist

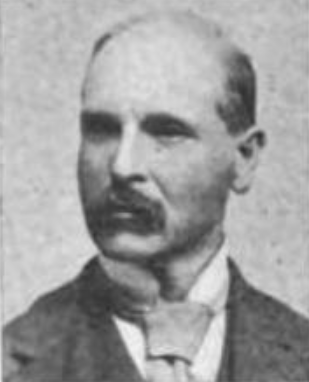
- Born: December 14, 1842; Geneva, Wisconsin
- Died: August 13, 1912 (aged 69); Austin, Texas
- Education: Harvard University; University of Strasbourg
- Occupation(s): Linguist, philologist
- Employer: University of Texas at Austin
- Spouse: Lula Primer
- Children: 1

Sylvester Primer (1842–1912) was an American linguist and philologist known for his pioneering work in 1887 on the dialect of the European-American residents of Charleston, South Carolina. He published language studies in both English and German, and an 1880 work in German was reprinted in 2010. He also published several annotated scholarly editions of important German-language and Spanish-language dramas from the 18th and 19th centuries. He taught for more than 20 years at the University of Texas at Austin, where he also headed the Romance language department as well as a new German-language department.

Primer grew up in western New York state and served with its units in the American Civil War. After the war, he completed preparatory studies, followed by his undergraduate degree at Harvard University. He did graduate studies in linguistics in Germany, where he received his PhD at the University of Strasbourg. He taught first at Brown University, then a decade at the College of Charleston, and briefly at Colorado College before joining the faculty in Texas.

== Early life and education ==
Born in Geneva, Wisconsin on December 14, 1842, as the son of Archibald and Eleanor (Jacoby) Primer, Sylvester moved in 1850 as a child with his family to New York. They settled in the western part of the state in Genesee County. He attended local schools as a child.

His higher education was interrupted by his serving in the American Civil War. Afterward Primer completed studies at Leroy (N.Y.) Academy until 1868 and the Phillips Exeter Academy until 1871. He went to college, studying languages at Harvard University, where he earned a bachelor's degree in 1874 and was Phi Beta Kappa. He went to Europe to study with scholars there and worked at Leipzig, Göttingen, and Strasbourg, where he received his PhD in 1880.

== Civil War ==
Primer served in the American Civil War, first in Company E of the 105th Regiment New York Volunteer Infantry from Genesee County, New York. He was with them when wounded during the Battle of Antietam. After his recovery, Primer later enlisted in and served with the Fifteenth New York Cavalry.

== Academic career as linguist ==
After completing his graduate work, Primer returned to the United States, teaching first at Brown University (1880–1881). He taught at the College of Charleston in South Carolina from 1881 to 1890. During this period, he first directed scholarly attention toward the unique dialect of the city of Charleston in a paper he delivered at the Modern Language Association of America in 1887. This pioneering work, "Charleston Provincialisms" (1887), is one of the first attempts by a scholar to describe the speech of an American community. It was published as part of the Transactions of the Modern Language Association, vol. III, 1888, p. 84–99; it was also published in Europe in Phonetische Studien, vol. i, 1888, p. 227; and in the American Journal of Philology, IX (1888), p. 198–213.

Primer also wrote "The Huguenot Element in Charleston's Provincialisms;" it was published in Phonetische Studien, vol. iii, 1891, p. 139.

In 1891, Primer joined the faculty of the University of Texas at Austin, where he served for more than 20 years. He first served as adjunct professor of Teutonic languages, eventually becoming an associate professor. He became chairman of the School of Romance language and in time, chair of a separate German department established at the university. There had been strong German immigration to the state during the mid- and late 19th century. Primer died at his home in Austin on August 13, 1912, survived by his wife and son.

In Texas, his wife Lula Primer worked at the university after his death, retiring in 1941. She wrote her memoirs in the 1940s, which reflected her life in Texas. She had long been active in the University Methodist Church, the University Ladies Club, the Austin's Women's Club, and the Travis County Council of Women.

== Works ==
- "The Pronunciation of Fredericksburg, Va.", in Pub. Modern Language Association, vol. v, 1889, p. 185.
- "The Pronunciation Near Fredericksburg, Va.", in the Proceedings of the American Philological Association (1889), p. xxv.
- "Dialectical Studies in West Virginia", Colorado College Studies (1891)

He also published in German:

- Die Consonatische Deklination in den germanischen Sprachen (1880/2010, reissued in paperback, Kessinger Publishing)

Primer published annotated scholarly editions of several European plays, including

- Gotthold Ephraim Lessing's Minna von Barnhelm (1767), (1889) edited and notes by Primer
- Gotthold E. Lessing, Nathan der Weise, (1894), ed. Sylvester Primer
- Johann Wolfgang von Goethe, Egmont (original 1788), (1898) annotated edition and introduction in English by Primer
- Guzman el Bueno. Drama en Cuatro Actos, Don Antonio Gil y Zárate, 1901/1916 revised edition by Ginn and Company, annotated and edited by Primer, with introduction in English, Internet Archive edition available online

Primer's seminal works on Charleston's unique and vanishing dialect continue to be among the most important scholarly contributions to the subject today.

== Legacy ==
Primer's personal and family papers are held by the University of Texas at Austin.
