= Rita Luna =

Spanish stage actress

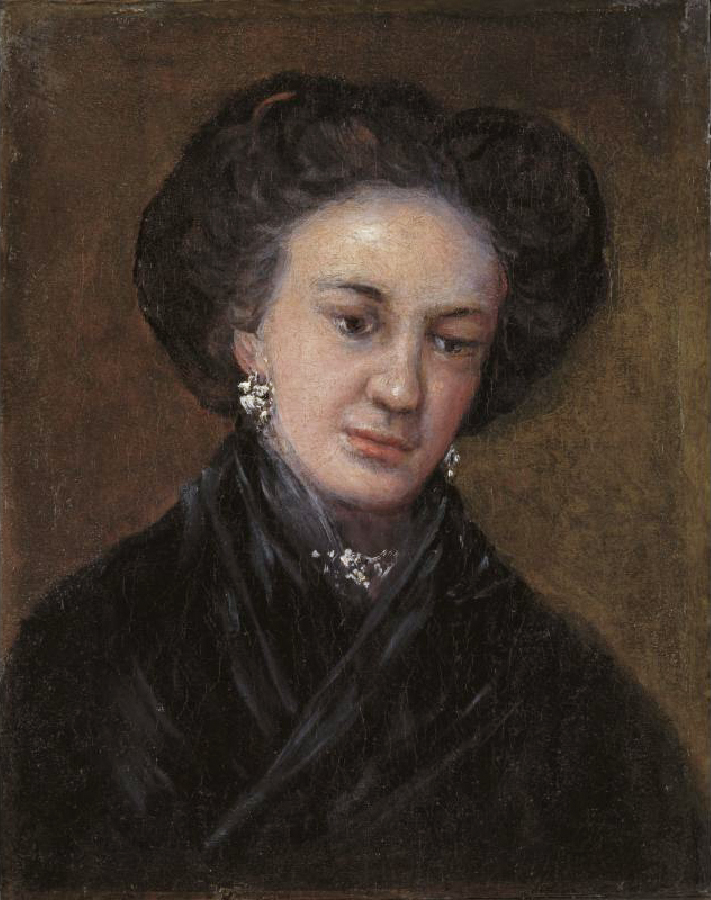
- Portrait of Rita Luna, by Francisco de Goya, c. 1814-1818.
- Born: 1770
- Died: 1832 (aged 61–62)

Rita Luna (1770–1832), was a Spanish stage actress. She is regarded as the leading female stage actor of the Spanish stage of her time.
