= Antonio Gil y Zárate =

Spanish dramatist and pedagogue (1793–1861)

The Most Excellent Antonio Gil
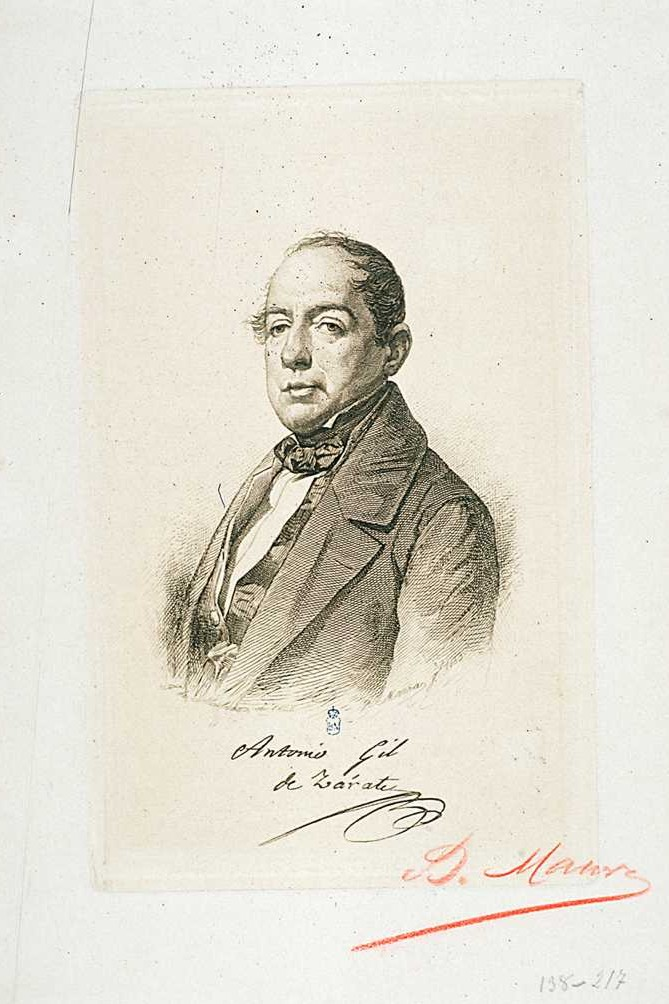
- Born: Antonio Gil y Zárate; 14 January 1793; El Escorial, Spain
- Died: 27 January 1861 (aged 68); Madrid, Spain

Seat P of the Real Academia Española
- In office 1841 – 27 January 1861
- Preceded by: Agustín José Mestre
- Succeeded by: Antonio García Gutiérrez

Antonio Gil y Zárate (1 December 1793–27 January 1861) was a Spanish dramatist and pedagogue whose work is associated with Romanticism. He is known for his tragedy, Guzmán el Bueno. Drama en Cuatro Actos, set in the Middle Ages and exploring the life of a legendary hero of Spain.

He was an academician of both the Real Academia de Bellas Artes de San Fernando and the Real Academia Española.

The mineral Zaratite was named after him.

== Early life and education ==
Antonio Gil y Zárate was born in El Escorial in 1793 to Bernardo Gil, an actor well known in Madrid, and Ántonia Zárate. His mother died when the boy was quite young, and his father married a "celebrated actress", Antera Baus, so Antonio grew up in the world of theatre in Madrid.

As a youth, Gil y Zárate was sent to France for several years for his studies; he also studied in Madrid, Spain, in the subjects of physics and mathematics. He spent another two years in France in studies, where he also enjoyed the latest works in French literature. After returning to Spain, initially Gil y Zárate entered Spanish politics, like other young men of his class, but he soon started writing dramas.

== Literary career ==
Gil y Zárate wrote his first play, the comedy La Cómico-Manía, in 1816, and was given encouragement. During the mid-1820s he had to deal with censorship, particularly that religious censorship by the Catholic Church, and ran into opposition for his work. For a few years he supported himself by teaching French at a commercial school in Madrid, until the climate lightened.

His next works to be produced were Blanca de Borbón, produced in 1835, and Carlos II el Hechizado in 1837, which was highly popular. At the turn of the 20th century, the American scholar Sylvester Primer characterized this play as full of "irreligious and obscene sentimentalism," and Gil y Zárate tried to recall it.

The playwright's most productive period was in the 1830s and 1840s; while his plays during this period were extremely popular, these have not been considered of lasting value. His play, Guzmán el Bueno. Drama en Cuatro Actos, set in "medieval days of Spanish history," was considered to be his most substantial. It explored the life of a national hero of Spain, Alonso Pérez de Guzmán, who had been treated as a figure in the nation's plays and literature for some time.

== Real Academia Española ==
Associated with the Real Academia Española as an honorary academician since 1839, he was appointed full member in 1841. Together with fellow academicians Manuel Bretón de los Herreros and Ventura de la Vega Gil y Zárate drew up the new Statutes approved by the Academia in 1848.

== Pidal Plan ==
The so-called Pidal Plan (1845) —the most important of a series of reforms in Spain's education system that would eventually lead to the so-called Ley Moyano (1857), which would remain in effect until 1970—, implemented the first major overhaul of Spain's education system. Although named after his friend and mentor, Pedro José Pidal, Spain's Minister of the Interior, who implemented the plan, it was actually drawn up by Gil y Zárate. The plan called for state-run institutos to be created in each provincial capital and among the many aspects it introduced were modifications to the syllabus, with the subjects of Spanish literature introduced at secondary level and geography and Spanish history introduced for both secondary and university students. (Note: Gil y Zárate stated that "It is shameful that there are people from the distinguished classes of society who do not know what this society has been and how it was formed".)

The plan also created the first chair in International Law, a post first held, albeit briefly, by Lorenzo Arrazola y García, a former Minister of Justice, future Prime Minister of Spain and President of the Supreme Court.

== Works ==
- La Cómico-Manía, 1816
- La Familia Catalana
- Él Entremetido, 1825, produced at El Teatra de Princípe
- Blanca de Borbon, 1829, first produced in 1835
- Carlos II el Hechizado, 1837
- Antonio Gil y Zárate, Guzmán el Bueno. Drama en Cuatro Actos, 1840s, (1901/1916 revised edition by Ginn and Company, annotated and edited by Sylvester Primer, with introduction in English), available online at Internet Archive of the Library of Congress.
