= Portrait of Doña Antonia Zárate (1805) =

Painting by Francisco de Goya

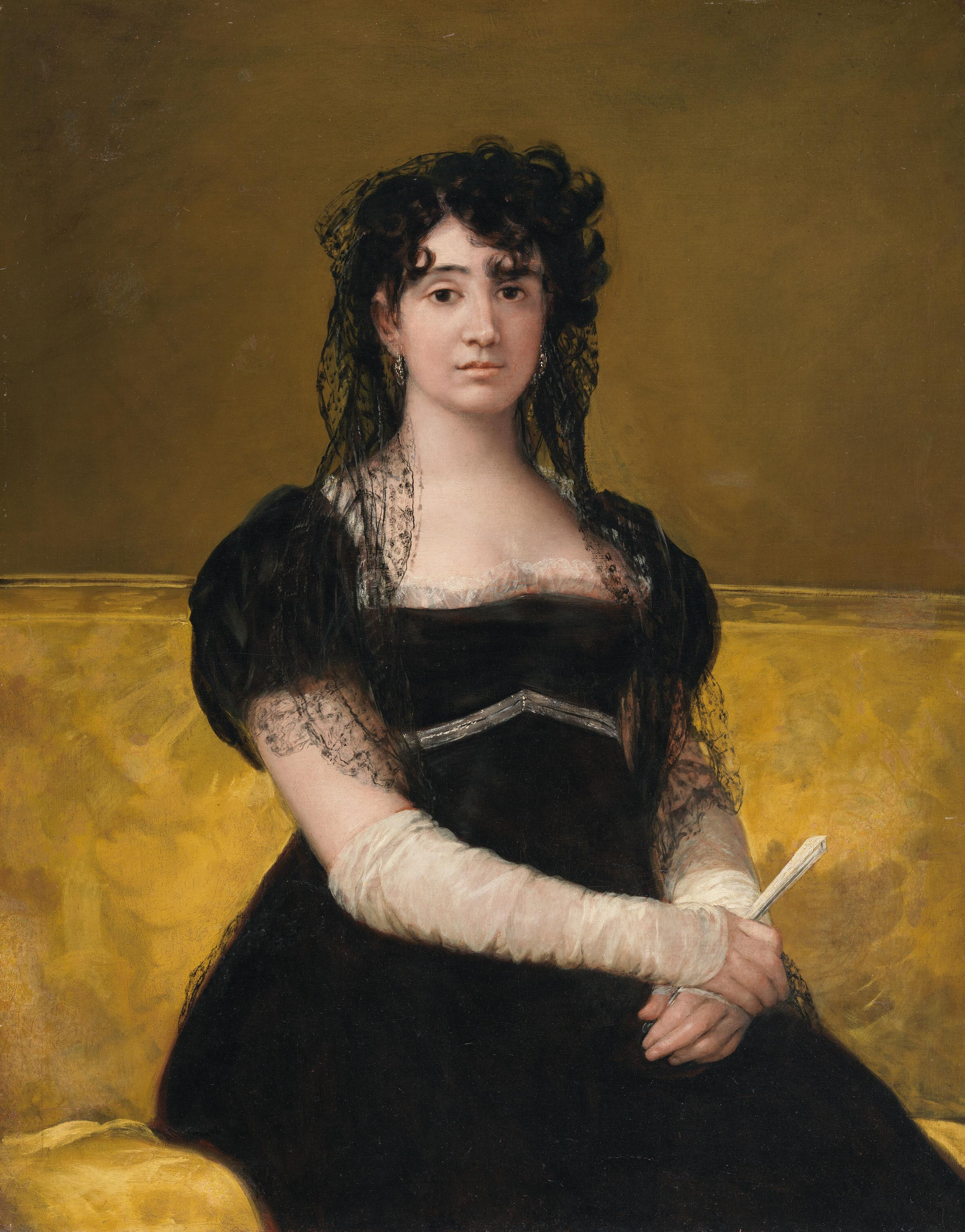
- Artist: Francisco Goya
- Year: c. 1805
- Medium: oil on canvas
- Dimensions: 103.5 cm × 82 cm (40.7 in × 32 in)
- Location: National Gallery of Ireland; Dublin

The Portrait of Doña Antonia Zárate is an oil painting by Spanish artist Francisco Goya, from c. 1805. It is the source for the 1810–11 portrait of her by Goya or his studio. It is held in the National Gallery of Ireland, in Dublin.

In 1900 it was put on show in Madrid and stated to be owned by Doña Adelaida Gil y Zárate. It was bought in London by Sir Otto Beit, who exhibited it at Russborough House and bequeathed it to his son Sir Alfred Beit. It was stolen from Russborough House in 1974 and 1986. A year after the second robbery it was nominally donated by Beit to the National Gallery of Ireland, though it was only recovered from the thieves in 1993.

== See also ==
- List of works by Francisco Goya

== Bibliography ==
- Donaldson, Sara. National Gallery of Ireland, Companion Guide. London, 2009 p. 15
