= Maria de Knuijt =

Dutch art patron (died 1681)

- Born: Maria Simonsdr de Knuijt
- Baptised: 21 December 1623
- Died: February 1681 (aged ≈57)
- Resting place: Old Church, Delft
- Known for: Patron of Dutch painter Johannes Vermeer
- Spouse: Pieter Claesz van Ruijven (m. 1653; died 1674)
- Children: Magdalena van Ruijven, who married Jacob Dissius (1653–1695)

Maria Simonsdr de Knuijt (Dutch pronunciation: [maːˈrijaː ˈsimɔnzˌdɔxtər də ˈknœyt]; buried 26 February 1681) was a patron of the Dutch painter Johannes Vermeer. She provided support and financial assistance to Vermeer throughout his career. De Knuijt was married to Pieter van Ruijven, a wealthy citizen of Delft, in the Netherlands. Pieter had been identified as Vermeer's main patron, owning more than half of Vermeer's oeuvre. Scholarship in 2023 identified de Knuijt as the main patron, as she had known him for some time and was more directly involved with the artist. After van Ruijven and de Knuijt died, their estate was inherited by their daughter Magdalena. She died about one year after her mother, and the estate was then inherited by her husband Jacob Dissius and his father Abraham Dissius.

== Biography ==
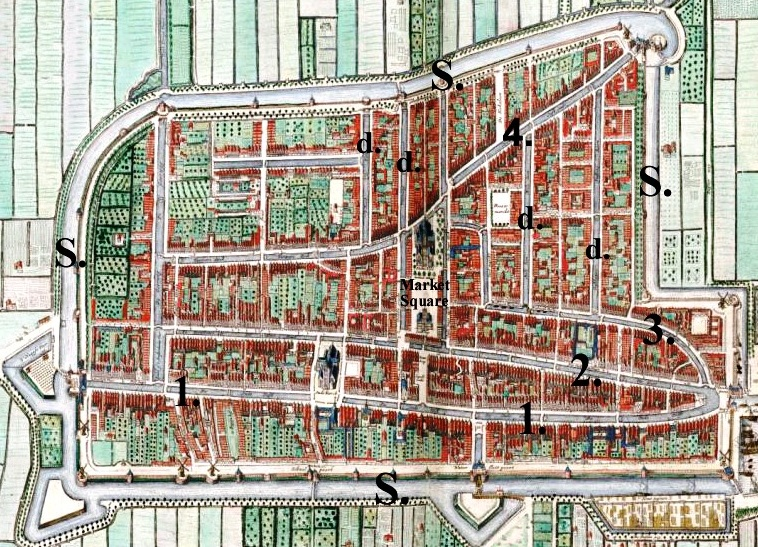
In Delft, the main gracht – Oude Delft – served as a waterway for transport.

Maria Simonsdr de Knuijt (Note: From a paper about Vermeer's neighbors, Maria de Knuijt, wife of Pieter Claesz (Nicolaesz) van Ruijven (1624–1674), was the daughter of Simon Vincenten (Senten) de Knuijt and Magdaleentje Willemsdr van der Mersch(e). Her parents were married in 1615. Her father died in 1656 and was buried 17 December 1656 at Oude Langendijk. Her mother died after 1653. De Knuijt was baptized on 21 December 1623. She had a brother Vincent (1620–1664), a shopkeeper who owned several houses and outside of Delft he owned land. They had two brothers named Willem who both died the years of their birth in 1622 and 1627. The Van Ruijvens and De Knuijts were Protestants. Simon, her father, owned two houses on the Markt north-side, just west of the Mechelen inn. In 1656, the year of his death, be bought and then sold a house on Oude Langendijk - West of Molenpoort. De Knuijt was nine years older than Vermeer, and would have known him from childhood. She was about the age of his sister Geertruy, so the two girls may have been friends. Note: The paper was well-written and documented with proper citations, but it does not seem to have had an editor, so this information is provided in a note, rather than in the body of the article.) married Pieter Claesz van Ruijven in August 1653. Pieter was born in December 1624, the son of Niclaes Pietersz and Maria Graswinckel. His father was the Master of the Camer van Charitate (municipal charitable department) in Delft from 1623 to 1624 and the brewer at Ox Brewery. The brewery failed about 1650 when Niclaes Pietersz died. De Knuijt brought most of the wealth into the marriage.

Pieter was not known to have a profession, but de Knuijt and van Ruijven were well-off and had two homes in Delft. From 1668 to 1674, Pieter was master of the Camer van Charitate. His fortune was made through wise investments of the riches they inherited. The van Ruijven family, who lived off the Oude Canal in Delft, were members of the Arminian party in the Dutch Reformed Church.

They had a daughter, Magdalena van Ruijven, baptized at the Old Church of Delft on 12 October 1655. She married Jacob Dissius on 14 April 1680, and was generally known after that by her husband's surname. Baptism records at the Old Church identify two additional children of Maria and Pieter, Maria baptized in 1657 and Simon in 1662. They are believed to have died young, since they were not identified as heirs to de Knuijt and Pieter's fortune.

Pieter died and was buried on 7 August 1674. De Knuijt died by 26 February 1681 when she was buried in Delft next to her husband at the Old Church. Their daughter Magdalena died on 16 June 1682 at the age of 27. She and her husband had no children. The van Ruijven estate was inherited by Jacob Dissius and his father Abraham Dissius. As stipulated in Magdalena's will, Abraham was to inherit half of the estate if her mother had died before her and Magdalena and Jacob did not have any children. This may have been because Jacob, of no means himself, married Magdalena, who was an heiress. Jacob may have been given the printing press his father Abraham owned to use as a dowry, and Abraham was compensated by receiving half of his son's inheritance. Besides the paintings, Magdalena's estate included her legacy of a house in Voorstraet, the domain of Spalant, and interest-bearing obligations.

== Patron of the arts ==
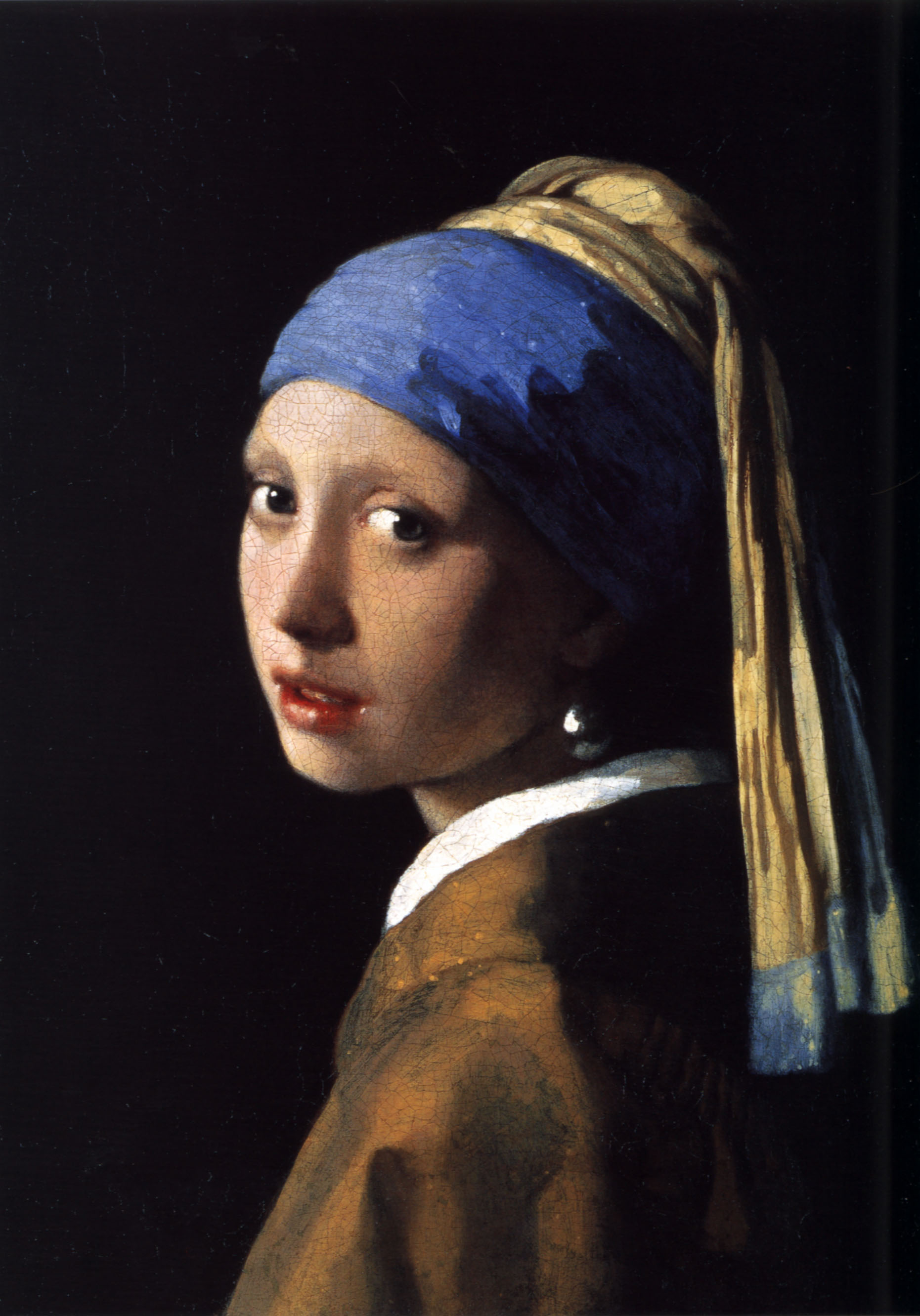
Johannes Vermeer, Girl with a Pearl Earring [Het meisje met de parel ], c. 1665, oil on canvas, Mauritshuis, The Hague, the Netherlands

De Knuijt and her husband Pieter patronized the arts and were buyers of the works of Johannes Vermeer. According to curators of a retrospective (10 February 2023 – 4 June 2023) of Vermeer's work at the national museum, Rijksmuseum, in Amsterdam, de Knuijt was his main patron. She was a close neighbor when Vermeer was a child, and was more involved in supporting Vermeer's career than her husband. De Knuijt began collecting his works around the time that Vermeer started painting portraits of young women. Before that, he painted mythological and religious-themed works. The de Knuijts owned more than half of Vermeer's entire oeuvre of 37 pieces, and they purchased their first painting that was painted in 1657. Between 1657 and 1659, Vermeer painted Girl Asleep at a Table and Officer and the Laughing Girl.

Aside from the evidence that it was de Knuijt who was the patron, some additional observations stated in "Perspectives on Women in the Art of Vermeer" make it most likely that de Knuijt was the main patron. Vermeer changed his focus to domestic scenes of wealthy women's lives, within de Knuijt's purview.

Vermeer's early predilection for the female figure; the growing market for pleasing images of youthful femininity; the identification of high-class burgher households with women in Dutch paintings of domestic life, and the aesthetic appeal to Vermeer of ordered, sunlit spaces associated with such households; the likely attraction of those subjects to women such as Maria de Knuijt, whose husband set out to build a choice collection of modern subjects painted by living masters associated with Delft: this combination of factors makes Vermeer's attention to women in his art easier to understand.

— Lisa Vergara

De Knuijt communicated her care and consideration for Vermeer when she bequeathed 500 guilders, then equal to about an annual salary for a craftsman, to him in a testament of 1665. He was the only non-family member mentioned in her will.

The series of twenty-one paintings owned by de Knuijt, (Note: Magdalena de Knuijt died in 1682, and her estate included 20 Vermeer paintings. Her husband, who died in 1695, held 21 paintings by Vermeer at the time of his death. The one painting difference may have been because the painting The Little Street was not identified as a work by Vermeer in the inventory of Magdalena's estate.) many now-famous, included Girl with a Pearl Earring. The collection was inherited by their daughter and her husband, Magdalena and Jacob Dissius. De Knuijt and her husband collected works of other artists, like Simon de Vlieger and Emanuel de Witte.

== Paintings by Vermeer ==
From the cited sources, the paintings numbered by the 1696 auction catalogue (numbers 1 through 12, 31 to 33, and 35 to 40) based upon Binstock's association of the catalogue — as well as Broos & Wheelock's association from their 1996 catalogue — to the Vermeer paintings:

Assignment of paintings to 1696 auction descriptions in some cases multiple paintings are assigned to a given description
Number	1696 description	Title	Years	City and museum
1	A young lady weighing gold	Woman Holding a Balance, also known as Young Lady Weighing Gold	c. 1662–1664	Washington, National Gallery of Art
2	A maid pouring out milk	The Milkmaid	c. 1657–1660	Amsterdam, Rijksmuseum
3	The portrait of Vermeer in a room with various accessories	The Astronomer	c. 1668	Paris, Musée d'Orsay (Note: Broos & Wheelock say The Astronomer and The Geographer were not in the Dissius sale and were sold together in the eighteenth century.)
4	A young lady playing a guitar	The Guitar Player	1672	London, Iveagh Bequest Kenwood
5	A gentleman is washing his hands	lost or unknown		
6	A young lady playing the clavicen in a room	The Music Lesson, or A Lady at the Virginals with a Gentleman	c. 1662–1665	London, Royal Collection
7	A young lady who is being brought a letter by a maid	The Love Letter	c. 1669–1670	Amsterdam, Rijksmuseum
7	A young lady who is being brought a letter by a maid	Mistress and Maid	c. 1667	New York, Frick Collection (Note: Binstock attributes this painting to Hendrick van Buyten's collection. Frick states, "Possibly Vermeer sale, 1696, Amsterdam, Lot 7, sold for 70 florins." and "Scholars agree that lot 7 in the Dissius sale ("A young lady to whom a letter is brought by a maid") is most likely the Frick's Mistress and Maid.")
8	A drunken sleeping maid at a table	A Girl Asleep	c. 1657–1658	New York, Metropolitan Museum of Art (Note: Broos and Wheelock state that the painting was lost since 1737, until it showed up in another auction in Amsterdam. Broos and Wheelock said that A Girl Asleep "has never been doubted that she is the "A Drunken Sleeping Maid at a Table" mentioned in the 1696 sale catalogue".)
9	A gay company in a room	The Procuress	1656	Dresden, Staatliche Kunstsammlungen, Gemäldegalerie Alte Meister
9	A gay company in a room	The Girl with the Wine Glass	c. 1659–1660	Braunschweig, Herzog Anton Ulrich Museum
10	A gentleman and a young lady making music in a room	Girl Interrupted at Her Music	c. 1658–1659,	New York, Frick Collection (Note: Binstock states that Girl Interrupted at Her Music is at the Berlin Staaliche Museum, Gemäldegalerie.)
11	A soldier with a laughing girl	Officer and Laughing Girl	c. 1658–1659	New York, Frick Collection
12	A young lady doing needlework	The Lacemaker	c. 1669–1670	Paris, Musée d'Orsay
31	The Town of Delft in perspective, to be seen from the south	View of Delft	ca. 1659–1663	The Hague, Mauritshuis
32	A view of a house standing in Delft	The Little Street	c. 1658–1660	Amsterdam, Rijksmuseum
33	A view of some house	lost or unknown, or The Little Street		
35	A writing young lady	A Lady Writing a Letter, also known as The Lady Writing	c. 1665	Washington, National Gallery of Art
36	A lady adorning herself	Woman with a Pearl Necklace	c. 1664	Berlin, Staatliche Museen, Gemäldegalerie (Note: Aside from de Knuijt, the painting may have been purchased by Dissius.)
37	A lady playing the clavicen	Lady Standing at a Virginal, also known as Young Woman Standing at a Virginal	c. 1670s	London, National Gallery
37	A lady playing the clavicen	A Young Woman Seated at the Virginals	c. 1670–1672	Leiden Collection
38, 39, 40	A tronie in antique dress	Girl with a Pearl Earring	c. 1665	The Hague, Mauritshuis
39, 40	A tronie in antique dress	Girl with a Red Hat	c. 1665–1669	Washington, National Gallery of Art (Note: This painting was not in Binstock's list. The provenance states, "Possibly Pieter Claesz van Ruijven; possibly by inheritance to his wife, Maria de Knuijt; possibly by inheritance to her daughter, Magdalena van Ruijven, Delft; possibly by inheritance to her husband, Jacobus Abrahamsz. Dissius, (sale, Amsterdam, 16 May 1696, probably no. 39 or 40).")
40	A pendant	Study of a Young Woman also Portrait of a Young Woman	c. 1665–1667	New York, Metropolitan Museum of Art

Several additional paintings have been identified at some point as potential 1696 auction paintings. One is the Girl with a Flute, which is believed to have been made by a studio associate of Vermeer. Girl Reading a Letter at an Open Window is another, the museum states that the earliest known owner of the painting was the Elector of Saxony and King of Poland, August III who acquired the painting in 1742. The Concert, which was stolen in 1990, does not have a provenance that ties it to the 1696 auction. (Note: The additional paintings include: Girl with a Flute — The National Gallery of Art states that Young Girl with a Flute, which has been historically identified as one of Vermeer's works, seems as if it could have been made by someone else due to irregularities in artistic quality. Binstock attributes this painting to Hendrick van Buyten's collection. The National Gallery of Art states that it was likely made by a study associate of Vermeer. The provenance there states, "Possibly Pieter Claesz van Ruijven; possibly by inheritance to his wife, Maria de Knuijt; possibly by inheritance to her daughter, Magdalena van Ruijven, Delft; possibly by inheritance to her husband, Jacobus Abrahamsz. Dissius, (sale, Amsterdam, 16 May 1696, probably no. 39 or 40)."; Girl Reading a Letter at an Open Window (also known as Young Woman Reading a Letter at an Open Window) c. 1659–1660, Dresden, Gemäldegalerie Alte Meister Two years later, however, Montias said in Vermeer and his milieu that this painting was not part of the 1696 inventory. The Gemäldegalerie Alte Meister states that the earliest known owner of the painting was the Elector of Saxony and King of Poland, August III who acquired the painting in 1742.; The Concert c. 1664–1665 - Isabella Stewart Gardner Museum, Boston Missing since its theft in 1990. Gardner Museum states regarding provenance, "Purchased by A. Delfos, probably for Diederik van Leyden, Lord of Vlaardingen (1744-1810) from the sale of the Johannes Lodewyk Strantwyk collection at Kabinet Konstige Schilderyen, Amsterdam for 315 florins on 10 May 1780, lot 150.Purchased by the dealer A. Paillet from the sale of the M. Van Leyden collection at Chez A. Paillet et H. Delaroche, Paris for 350 francs on 10 September 1804, lot 62.")

== Provenance ==
Determining the provenance of paintings owned by Pieter Claesz van Ruijven, Maria de Knuijt, their daughter Magdalena, and her husband Jacob begins with the list of Vermeer's paintings sold at an auction in 1696, one year after the death of Jacob Dissius and two years after his father's death. Another list of paintings held by Magdalena and Jacob Dissius was made in 1683, one year after Magdalena's death, but that list just stated the number of Vermeer paintings within the rooms of Magdalena and Jacob's residence. (Note: The inventory of 1683 stated the number of paintings for each applicable room, totaling 20 Vermeer works of art. The Frick Collection states, "According to this document, there were eleven Vermeers in the front room of Dissius's house on Delft's Markt (or "Market"); four in the back room; one in the kitchen, which apparently also served as a bedroom; two in a basement room; and two elsewhere in the residence. The subjects of the paintings in the Dissius home are not specified in the 1683 inventory.")

In the late 1980s the art historian John Michael Montias proposed that Pieter Claesz van Ruijven was Vermeer's patron beginning in 1657 when van Ruijven made a loan to Vermeer of 200 guilders, which coincided with a significant change in subjects and themes for Vermeer's works. Montias concluded that the majority of the 21 Vermeer paintings in the 1696 auction following Jacob Dissius's death had initially been purchased by Pieter Claesz van Ruijven. However Broos & Wheelock note that there is no documentary evidence that Pieter van Ruijven bought or owned works by Vermeer and argue that some of the paintings could have been acquired by Dissius, his wife Magdalena, or his father Abraham.

The 16 May 1696 auction in Amsterdam offered 21 Vermeer paintings made between 1657 and 1673, two years before Vermeer's death. After the auction, Vermeer paintings were held privately for many years, sometimes centuries. When some of Vermeer's works resurfaced, they were incorrectly attributed to other Dutch artists, such as Pieter de Hooch and Rembrandt.

== Bibliography ==
- Binstock, Benjamin (7 March 2013). Vermeer's Family Secrets: Genius, Discovery, and the Unknown Apprentice. Routledge. ISBN 978-1-136-08706-6.
- Broos, Ben; Wheelock, Arthur K. Jr. (1996). Wheelock, Arthur K. (ed.). "Johannes Vermeer" (PDF). National Gallery of Art, Washington, D.C. and Royal Cabinet of Paintings Mauritshuis, The Hague. New Haven: Yale University Press and Netherlands: Waanders, Zwolle.
- Montias, John Michael (1987). "Vermeer's Clients and Patrons". The Art Bulletin. 69 (1): 68–76. doi:10.2307/3051083. ISSN 0004-3079. JSTOR 3051083. Including footnotes.
