= Girl with a Pearl Earring (novel) =

1999 novel by Tracy Chevalier

- First British edition dustjacket
- Author: Tracy Chevalier
- Language: English
- Genre: Historical fiction
- Publisher: HarperCollins (UK); Dutton (US)
- Publication date: January 1, 1999
- Media type: Print (Hardcover)
- Pages: 258 pp
- OCLC: 42623358
- Dewey Decimal: 813/.54 21
- LC Class: PS3553.H4367 G57 1999

Girl with a Pearl Earring is a 1999 historical novel written by Tracy Chevalier. Set in 17th-century Delft, Holland, the novel was inspired by local painter Johannes Vermeer's Girl with a Pearl Earring. Chevalier presents a fictional account of Vermeer, the model and the painting. The novel was adapted into a 2003 film of the same name and a 2008 play. In May 2020, BBC Radio 4 broadcast a new dramatisation of the novel.

== Background ==
Tracy Chevalier's inspiration for the novel was a poster of Johannes Vermeer's Girl with a Pearl Earring. She had bought the poster as a nineteen-year-old and it hung wherever she lived for sixteen years. Chevalier noted that the "ambiguous look" on the girl's face left a lasting impression on her. She describes the girl's expression "to be a mass of contradictions: innocent yet experienced, joyous yet tearful, full of longing and yet full of loss." She began to think of "the story behind that look”, imagining it as directed at the painter.

Chevalier's research included reading the history of the period, studying the paintings of Vermeer and his peers, and spending several days in Delft. Pregnant at the time of researching and writing, she finished the work in eight months because she had a "biological deadline".

== Plot ==
Sixteen-year-old Griet has to leave her family home in Delft in 1664 after her father is blinded in an accident. As a tile-painter, her father is a member of the artists’ guild, so employment is found for her as a maid in painter Johannes Vermeer's household. In the strictly stratified society of the time, this is a fall in status because of the bad reputation that maids have for stealing, spying and sleeping with their employers. A further complication is that the Vermeers belong to the grudgingly tolerated Catholic minority while Griet is a Protestant. At their home, she befriends the family's oldest daughter, Maertge, but is never on good terms with the spiteful Cornelia, a younger daughter who takes after her class-conscious mother, Catharina. Griet also finds it difficult to keep on the right side of Tanneke, the other house servant, who is moody and jealous.

Griet lives for two years at her employers’ and is only allowed to visit her home on Sundays, where the family circle is breaking up. Her younger brother Frans is apprenticed outside and eventually her younger sister Agnes dies of the plague. But during the early months of her work at the Vermeers', Pieter, the son of the family butcher at the meat market, starts courting Griet. She has been strictly brought up and does not welcome this at first, but tolerates his interest because it is of advantage to her impoverished parents.

Griet is increasingly fascinated by Vermeer's paintings. Vermeer discovers that Griet has an eye for art and secretly asks her to run errands and perform tasks for him, such as mixing and grinding colors for his paints and acting as a substitute model. This takes up much of her time, and Griet arouses the suspicions of Catharina, but Vermeer's mother-in-law, Maria Thins, recognizes Griet's presence as a steadying and catalyzing force in Vermeer's career and connives at the domestic arrangements that allow her to devote more time to his service. However, Griet is warned by Vermeer's friend, Antonie van Leeuwenhoek, not to get too close to the artist because he is more interested in painting than he is in people. Realizing that this is true, Griet remains cautious.

Vermeer's wealthy but licentious patron, Pieter van Ruijven, notices “the wide-eyed maid”, molests her when he can and pressures Vermeer to paint them together, as he had with an earlier maid that Van Ruijven had then made pregnant. Griet and Vermeer are therefore reluctant to fulfil this request and eventually Vermeer comes up with a compromise. Van Ruijven will be painted with members of his own family and Vermeer will paint a portrait of Griet by herself which is to be sold to Van Ruijven. For the painting, he forces her to pierce her ears and wear his wife's pearl earrings without her permission. Cornelia seizes the chance to let Catharina discover this and in the resulting scandal Vermeer remains silent and Griet is forced to leave.

Ten years later, long after Griet has married Pieter and settled into life as a mother and butcher's wife, she is called back to the house following Vermeer's death. Griet assumes that Vermeer's widow wishes to settle the household's unpaid butcher’s bill. There Griet learns that Vermeer had asked for her painting to be hung in the room as he was dying. In addition, though the family is now poorer, Vermeer's will has included a request that Griet receive the pearl earrings that she wore when he painted her, which Van Leeuwenhoek forces Catharina to hand over. Griet realizes, however, that she could no more wear them as a butcher's wife than she could have as a maid. She therefore decides to pawn the earrings and pay the fifteen guilders owed to her husband from the price.

== Reception ==
The novel was published in Britain in 1999 and a year later in the United States, where it became a New York Times bestseller. It was nominated for several fiction prizes, and won the Barnes & Noble Discover Award in 2000 and the 2001 Alex Award for books that have special appeal to young adults. In 2001 Plume released the U.S. paperback edition with an initial print-run of 120,000 copies; a year later the book had been reprinted 18 times with close to two million copies sold. In 2005 HarperCollins brought out a UK special edition with nine colour plates of Vermeer paintings, published in celebration of one million copies sold.

The New York Times described the work as a "brainy novel whose passion is ideas"; Atlantic Monthly praised Chevalier's effort "in creating the feel of a society with sharp divisions in status and creed”. However, Publishers Weekly noted details that “threaten to rob the narrative of its credibility. Griet's ability to suggest to Vermeer how to improve a painting demands one stretch of the reader's imagination. And Vermeer's acknowledgment of his debt to her, revealed in the denouement, is a blatant nod to sentimentality”. Details were also called into question by the art historian Gary Schwarz, particularly the simplistic portrayal of the Catholic/Protestant division in a country where the differences between Protestants were equally important.

As well as the high English-language sales, the novel’s popularity has seen it translated into most European languages and in Asia into Turkish, Georgian, Persian, Indonesian, Thai, Vietnamese, Chinese and Korean.

== Themes ==
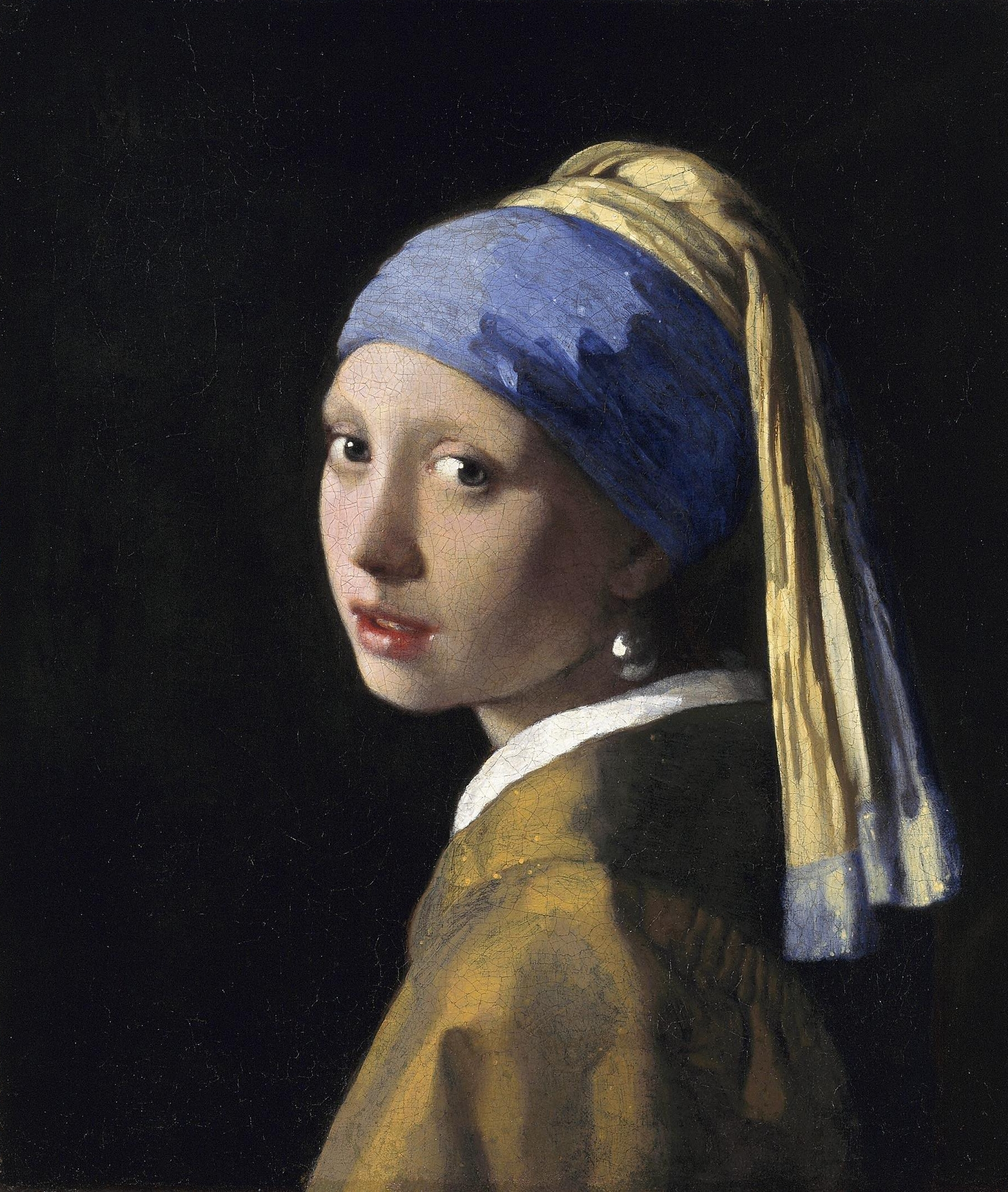
In Chevalier's fictional account, the character Griet is the model for Vermeer's painting

Rather than writing a story of Vermeer having an illicit relationship with the household maid, Chevalier builds tension in the work with the depiction of their restraint. As Time magazine notes, Chevalier presents "an exquisitely controlled exercise that illustrates how temptation is restrained for the sake of art". The restraint is also a function of the distanced style that Chevalier chose for her narrator, Griet. It has been noted that its aim is to replicate Vermeer's style of painting. It concentrates particularly on visual detail, both in the appearance of characters and of domestic surroundings, and their spatial placing in relation to each other.

It is this cool approach that differentiates the book from the three other novels published in 1999 which also deal with 17th century Dutch painting. Susan Vreeland's Girl in Hyacinth Blue is a set of stories centred upon a supposedly lost painting by Vermeer; and Katharine Weber’s The Music Lesson deals with the stolen Vermeer painting of that title. Deborah Moggach's Tulip Fever, on the other hand, is set in Amsterdam and also deals with the love between a painter and his subject. In addition, it too started from an attempt to decipher the enigmatic look of the sitter in a painting of the period.

Another theme - that is demonstrated in the narration rather than commented on overtly - is how women of that time, in Lisa Fletcher's words, "did not own their bodies, but were the possessions first of their parents, then of their employers, and finally of their husbands. As the novel progresses, Griet becomes increasingly aware that she is 'for sale'". She is given no choice by her parents over whether or where she will work. Van Ruijven and other characters assume she is sexually available simply because she is an unchaperoned maid. And once Pieter becomes Griet's accepted suitor, her parents leave her alone to his physical advances, anticipating that the match will be to their benefit.

=== Historical materials ===
Apart from Girl with a Pearl Earring itself, in which Griet is the sitter, several more of Vermeer’s paintings feature in Chevalier's novel. At the very start, View of Delft is recalled by Griet's father. When Griet enters the household, Vermeer is working on Woman with a Pearl Necklace and Tanneke mentions soon after that she had been Vermeer's model for The Milkmaid. His next subject is Woman with a Water Jug, for which the baker's daughter models. Griet describes the painting to her father and also witnesses its creation in closer detail now that she is helping in the studio. Van Ruijven's wife (Maria de Knuijt) later models for A Lady Writing a Letter. During this episode it is recalled that she had previously appeared in Woman with a Lute and that her husband had seduced the maid who sat for The Girl with the Wine Glass. Van Ruijven himself, a sister and a daughter, figure in The Concert, which is conceived of as a successor to The Music Lesson. A further painting, The Procuress, is not Vermeer's painting of that title but a genre piece by Dirck van Baburen that belongs to Maria Thins. This hangs on the wall to the right of The Concert. Finally we hear from Vermeer's daughter Maertge that she has been painted, a reference to Study of a Young Woman.

These paintings that survive compensate for the lack of much real information available in the historical record about the main male characters. That has allowed Chevalier to integrate into her imaginary scenario some of the few facts that are known about Vermeer and so give her fiction the appearance of reality. But scarcity of evidence extends outside the Vermeer household as well. Although Antonie van Leeuwenhoek is known to have acted as executor to Vermeer's will, there is no documentary proof of friendship between the two. Van Leeuwenhoek was certainly interested in optical devices and it has been speculated that Vermeer made use of a camera obscura, but that is as far as the evidence goes. Again, there is a high level of probability that Pieter van Ruijven was Vermeer's patron, since 21 of the artist’s paintings belonged to his estate, but no documentary evidence survives. And there is certainly not the slightest hint that he was the sexual predator that Chevalier portrays.

Such considerations are important since, as Lisa Fletcher argues, historical novels "intervene in our view of the past" and influence our reaction to it in the present. Thus it was noted that the 2001 exhibition of “Vermeer and the Delft School” at the Metropolitan Museum of Art in New York "attracted almost twice the number of visitors than the Vermeer exhibition held at the National Gallery of Art in Washington in 1996. For Walter Liedtke, the gallery's curator of European paintings, the success of [the exhibition] was due, at least in part, to Chevalier's novel."

== See also ==
- Girl with a Pearl Earring (film)
- Girl with a Pearl Earring (play)

== Bibliography ==
- Tracy Chevalier, Girl with a Pearl Earring, HarperCollins paperback, London 2000
- Lisa Fletcher, Chevalier's Girl with a Pearl Earring, Insight Publications 2012
- Lisa Fletcher, "His paintings don't tell stories...": Historical Romance and Vermeer, Sheffield Hallam University
