= Jacob Dissius =

Dutch typographer and printer

Jacob Abrahamsz. Dissius (1653 — 1695) was a Dutch typographer and printer. He inherited a collection of 21 of Johannes Vermeer's works, including The Milkmaid, Portrait of a Young Woman, A Girl Asleep, Woman Holding a Balance, and The Music Lesson. In 1680, he married Magdalena, daughter and sole heir of Vermeer's main patron Maria de Knuijt, her mother, with her father Pieter van Ruijven. Dissius died in 1695, and his collection was auctioned off in Amsterdam the following year.

== Biography ==
Jacob Abrahamsz. Dissius was baptised on 23 November 1653 in Delft as the son of Maria Cloeting and the printer Abraham Dissius. He married Magdalena Pieters van Ruijven, born in 1655, on 14 April 1680, and was generally known after that by her husband's surname. Her parents were Pieter van Ruijven and Maria de Knuijt, patrons of Johannes Vermeer for the better part of the artist's career. In 2023, his mother-in-law Maria de Knuijt was identified by the curators of the 2023 exhibition of Vermeer's works at the Rijksmuseum in Amsterdam as the main patron due to her long-standing and supportive relationship with the artist. Dissius' father-in-law was one of the wealthier citizens of Delft. He was master of the Camer van Charitate (municipal charitable department). His fortune was made through wise investments of the riches he and his wife inherited.

Dissius acquired some distinction from his grandfather and namesake, the pastor of a Protestant church in Het Wout, Jacob Dissius. Dissius, a bookbinder, registered at the Guild of Saint Luke in 1676. Four years later, after he was married, he registered as a bookseller. He lived and worked at the "Golden ABC" (Het Gulden ABC) print shop on the Market Square of Delft that was owned by his father.

Magdalena's father and mother died in 1674 and 1681. Magdalena inherited the Vermeer art collection, other works of art, a house in Voorstraet, the domain of Spalant, and interest-bearing obligations.

Magdalena died on 16 June 1682 at the age of 27. She and her husband had no children. Dissius borrowed money from his father to pay for burial and related costs, including mourning clothes. An inventory was taken in 1683 of the paintings held by Magdalena, but the list just stated the number of Vermeer paintings within the rooms of Magdalena and Jacob's residence. The inventory of 1683 stated the number of paintings for each applicable room, totaling 20 Vermeer works of art. The Frick Collection states, "According to this document, there were eleven Vermeers in the front room of Dissius's house on Delft's Markt (or "Market"); four in the back room; one in the kitchen, which apparently also served as a bedroom; two in a basement room; and two elsewhere in the residence. The subjects of the paintings in the Dissius home are not specified in the 1683 inventory."

The van Ruijven estate was inherited by Jacob Dissius and his father Abraham Dissius, with each receiving their half in April 1683. As stipulated in Magdalena's will, Abraham was to inherit half of the estate if her mother had died before her and Magdalena and Jacob had no children. This may have been because Jacob, of no means himself, married Magdalena, who was an heiress. Jacob may have been given the printing press his father Abraham owned to use as a dowry, and Abraham was compensated by receiving half of his son's inheritance. Magdalena's maternal uncle Vincent de Knuijt and her paternal aunts Sara and Maria took Dissius to the High Court of Holland in 1684 and 1685 about the estate. The commissioner decided that the estate should be split between father and son, as was stipulated in Magdalena's testament.

His father Abraham died and was buried on 12 March 1694 at the New Church. It seems that Jacob was his universal heir and would have inherited the other half of his wife's estate. Jacob Dissius died in October 1695 and was buried at Het Wout.

== Auction ==
Vermeer paintings that had been owned by Pieter Claesz van Ruijven, Maria de Knuijt, their daughter Magdalena were first identified by subject matter at an auction in 1696, one year after the death of Jacob Dissius and two years after his father's death. The 16 May 1696 auction in Amsterdam offered 21 Vermeer paintings made between 1657 and 1673, two years before Vermeer's death. One painting more than the inventory of Vermeer paintings inventoried in 1683, the difference could be that one Vermeer painting was misidentified to another artist. After the auction, Vermeer paintings were held privately for many years, sometimes centuries. When some of Vermeer's works resurfaced, they were incorrectly attributed to other Dutch artists, like Pieter de Hooch and Rembrandt.

Three of Emanuel de Witte works were included in the auction, The Tomb of the Old Prince, a church, The Old Church in Amsterdam.

== Art collection ==
Three documents are crucial in reconstructing the art collection of Jacob Dissius: the inventory of his estate in April 1683, after the death of his parents-in-law and his wife; a document listing the division of this inheritance between Jacob and his father Abraham Dissius, which was united in Jacob's possession after the death of his father in 1694; and the list of the auction of his collection after his death in October 1695.

=== Jan Vermeer ===
From the cited sources, the paintings in de Knuijt's collection were:

- A Girl Asleep c. 1657
- Officer and Laughing Girl c. 1657
- The Milkmaid c. 1657–1658
- The Little Street c. 1657–1658
- Girl Interrupted at Her Music c. 1658–1659
- The Girl with the Wine Glass c. 1659–1660
- View of Delft ca. 1659–1661
- Woman Holding a Balance c. 1662–1664
- The Music Lesson, or A Lady at the Virginals with a Gentleman c. 1662–1665
- Woman with a Pearl Necklace c. 1664
- Girl with a Pearl Earring c. 1665
- A Lady Writing a Letter c. 1665
- Girl with a Red Hat c. 1665–1666
- Study of a Young Woman c. 1665–1667
- Mistress and Maid c. 1667
- The Astronomer c. 1668
- Girl with a Red Hat c. 1669
- The Lacemaker c. 1669–1670
- A Young Woman Seated at the Virginals c. 1670–1672
- The Guitar Player 1672

Potentially made by another artist:

- Girl with a Flute — The National Gallery of Art states that Young Girl with a Flute, which has been historically identified as one of Vermeer's works, seems as if it could have been made by someone else due to irregularities in artistic quality.

=== Others ===
- A seascape by Jan Porcellis
- Four landscapes by Simon de Vlieger
- The Tomb of the Old Prince, The Old Church in Amsterdam, and another church by Emanuel de Witte
- A tronie by Rembrandt
- A portrait of Erasmus

== Bibliography ==
- Broos, Ben; Wheelock, Arthur K. Jr. (1996). Wheelock, Arthur K. (ed.). "Johannes Vermeer" (PDF). National Gallery of Art, Washington, D.C. and Royal Cabinet of Paintings Mauritshuis, The Hague. New Haven: Yale University Press and Netherlands: Waanders, Zwolle.
- Montias, John Michael (1987). "Vermeer's Clients and Patrons". The Art Bulletin. 69 (1): 68–76. doi:10.2307/3051083. ISSN 0004-3079. JSTOR 3051083. Including footnotes.
