= Mistress and Maid =

1666 painting by Johannes Vermeer

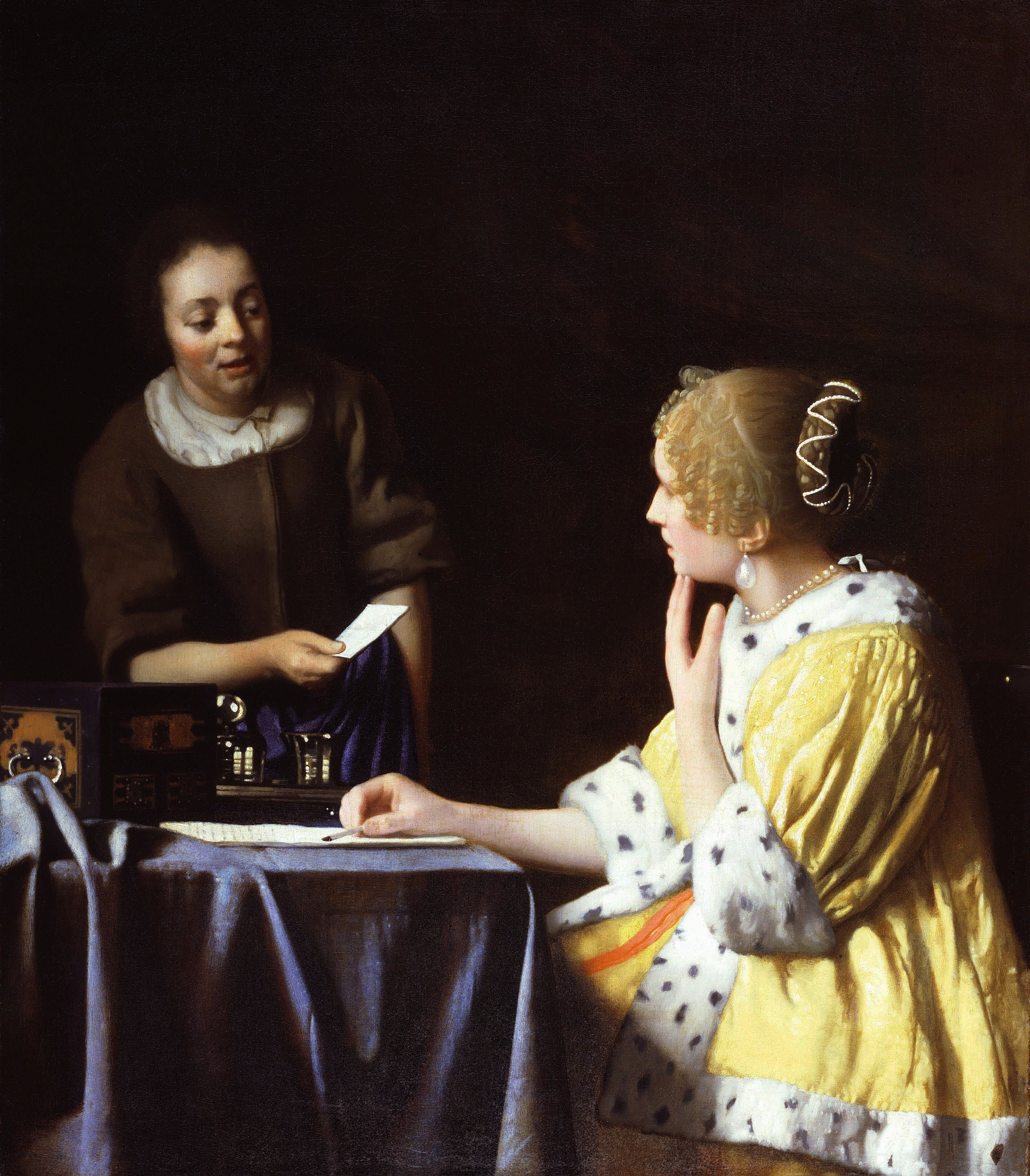
- Artist: Johannes Vermeer
- Year: 1666
- Medium: canvas
- Dimensions: 90.2 cm (35.5 in) × 78.7 cm (31.0 in)
- Location: Frick Collection
- Owner: Eugène Secrétan, Pieter van Ruijven
- Accession: 1919.1.126

Mistress and Maid (Dutch: Dame en dienstbode) is an oil-on-canvas painting produced by Johannes Vermeer c. 1667. It portrays two women, a mistress and her maid, as they look over the mistress' letter. The painting displays Vermeer's preference for yellow and blue, female models, and domestic scenes. It is now in the Frick Collection in New York City.

== Artist ==
Johannes Vermeer was born in 1632 in Delft, Holland. He worked and lived in Delft all his life, although it is possible that he may have done an apprenticeship in another town such as Amsterdam or Utrecht for six years. A major stepping point in Vermeer's career was in 1653 when he joined the Guild of Saint Luke as a master and professional painter. Vermeer painted at a somewhat leisurely pace, producing two to three paintings a year; there are 35 known to exist today. Vermeer is thought to have made use of a camera obscura, which may have influenced the way he often painted highlights as unfocused circles of confusion. Vermeer died at a relatively young age, 43, in 1675. He suffered most likely from a stroke or stress-induced heart attack. The slow rate at which he produced paintings restricted Vermeer from becoming wealthy during his lifetime, and he died in debt.

== Description ==
Mistress and Maid was painted during 1666–1667. The painting shows an elegant mistress and her maid as they look over a letter that the mistress just received. There is a strong use of yellow in the woman's elegant fur-lined overcoat, and blue in the silk tablecloth and the maid's apron. The focus of the painting is the two women as they are sitting at a desk, doing an everyday activity. Vermeer was known for his domestic scenes containing women. The light in the painting comes from the left, and falls on the mistress' face. The mistress has a pensive gaze, with her lips parted slightly and her fingertips lifted to her chin in a questioning manner. The lighted parts of the yellow overcoat are formed with sweeping brushstrokes of lead-tin-yellow and the shadows are created with definition. Vermeer uses a dark background, as he does in other paintings such as Portrait of a Young Woman and Girl with a Pearl Earring. Pearls were an important status symbol of the period and that was reflected in the mistress' fancy attire and her abundance of pearls.

Letters are a prevalent theme in Vermeer's paintings from the 1660s. Earlier works, such as Woman in Blue Reading a Letter (c. 1663–4), depict a woman by herself with a letter, but in this painting the added maid is a new element. The gestures and expressions of the two women suggest anxiety over the letter and its potential contents. The painting is well preserved.

== See also ==
- List of paintings by Johannes Vermeer
- Girl with a Pearl Earring
- Portrait of a Young Woman
