= Girl with a Flute =

1665–1670 painting attributed to Johannes Vermeer

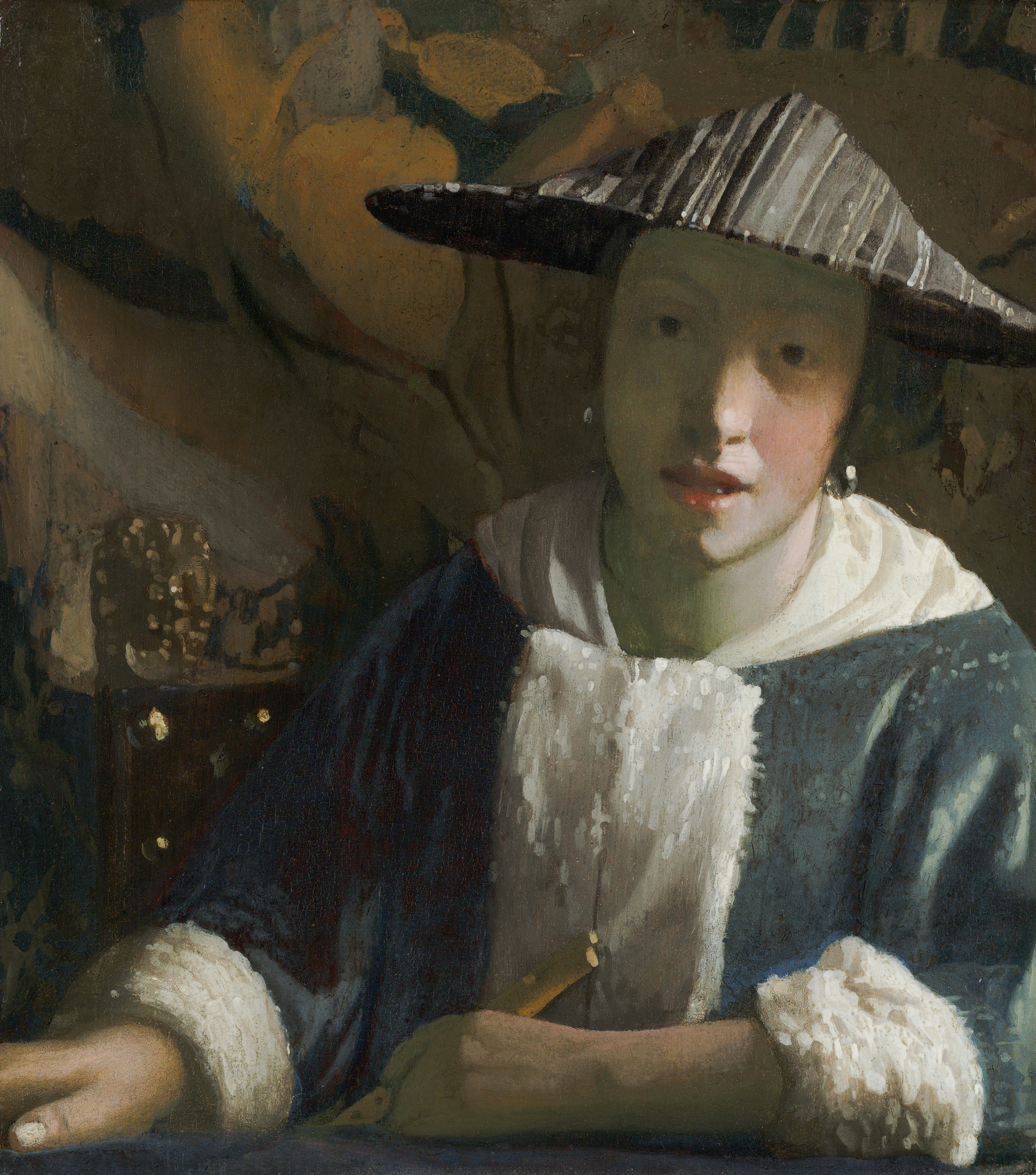
- Artist: studio of Johannes Vermeer
- Year: c. 1669–1675
- Medium: Oil on panel
- Dimensions: 20 cm × 17.8 cm (7.9 in × 7.0 in)
- Location: National Gallery of Art, Washington, D.C.
- Accession: 1942.9.98

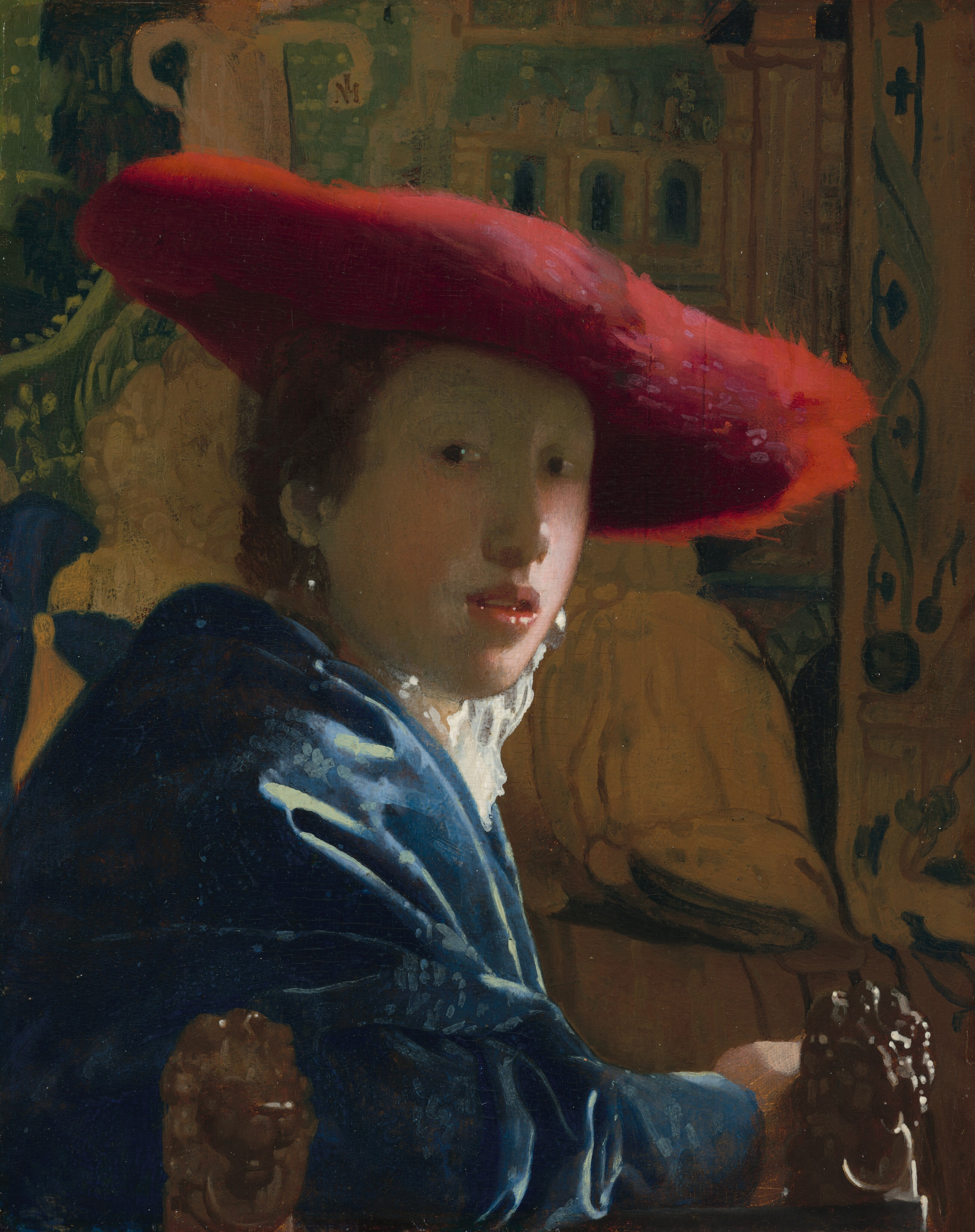
Girl with a Red Hat, a work by Johannes Vermeer

Girl with a Flute (Dutch: Meisje met de fluit) is a small painting by a member of the studio of Johannes Vermeer. It is currently believed to have probably been painted between 1669 and 1675. It is owned by the National Gallery of Art in Washington, D.C. along with three paintings attributed to Vermeer: Woman Holding a Balance, A Lady Writing a Letter, and Girl with a Red Hat.

== Description ==
The small 20 cm × 18 cm (8 in × 7 in) artwork is painted on a wood panel, as is the uncontested Vermeer painting Girl with a Red Hat, which is the only other painting associated with Vermeer on a wood panel. Girl with a Red Hat is slightly larger, 23 cm × 18 cm (9 in × 7 in).

The painting is a close-up portrait of a girl, facing front, wearing a widely conical striped hat and a blue-green fur-trimmed jacket, holding a double recorder. The background is a tapestry similar to that in Girl with a Red Hat.

The fur-trimmed jacket is known as a jak or manteltje, a garment very prevalent in at-home attire for Dutch women of all socioeconomic classes in the 17th century, and commonly found worn by women in domestic genre paintings by mid to late 17th-century Dutch painters such as Gerard ter Borch, Gabriel Mets, and Frans van Mieris. Similar jackets are worn in Vermeer's Woman Holding a Balance and The Concert, and a yellow yak is worn in A Lady Writing.

Girl with a Flute is a tronie, a study of a remarkable facial expression or a stock character in costume. This was a popular genre in Dutch Golden Age painting. Tronies were produced for the mass market, not for patrons. Unlike typical portraits, the models were not identified.

== Ownership ==
Girl with a Flute may have been first owned by the family of Vermeer's patron Pieter van Ruijven, and it was possibly sold at the 1696 Dissius auction in Amsterdam, probably catalogue number 39 or 40.

By the 1870s the painting was apparently owned by the van Son family in the Netherlands, and then by marriage by the van Boxtel family. Subsequent heir Mahie van Boxtel en Liempde married Belgian art collector Jean de Grez (1837–1910).

In 1906 the painting was discovered at the De Grez Collection in Brussels by Abraham Bredius, director of the Mauritshuis, who identified it as a Vermeer.

Following the death of Jean de Grez, the painting was sold in 1916 to the Dutch collector August Janssen, who died in 1918. After his death the painting was exhibited publicly for a while and then sold to the New York art dealership Knoedler & Co. in 1921.

In 1923, the American art collector Joseph E. Widener bought the painting. He donated it to the National Gallery of Art in 1942.

== Attribution ==
The painting's attribution has been questioned since 1942, although prior to 2022 it was generally cautiously attributed to Vermeer.

In October 2022 the National Gallery of Art announced that while the museum was closed during the COVID-19 pandemic, its team of conservators, curators, and scientists examined the painting using microscopic pigment analysis and advanced imaging technology, and concluded that the work was not painted by Vermeer, and that as of October 8, 2022, the gallery would change the attribution of the painting to "Studio of Johannes Vermeer". There had been suspicions in the past that Vermeer may have begun the piece but another artist finished the work; however the National Gallery of Art's team of curators, art historians, conservators, research conservators, research scientists, and imaging scientists concluded, based on the "fatal flaws" in execution they discovered in every layer and every stage of the painting, that Vermeer had no involvement in painting any of it.

The National Gallery of Art concluded that

The mystery artist who painted Girl with a Flute was familiar with Vermeer’s unique methods and materials, but unable to achieve his level of expertise. They may have been a pupil or apprentice in training, an amateur who paid Vermeer for lessons, a freelance painter hired on a project-by-project basis, or even a member of Vermeer’s family.

In his 2013 book Vermeer's Family Secrets: Genius, Discovery, and the Unknown Apprentice, Benjamin Binstock made an extensive case that Vermeer's eldest child Maria (born 1654) is the author of this and several other "misfit" Vermeer paintings. The National Gallery of Art's 2022 report noted that "While it is conceivable that Maria received instruction from her father and produced paintings in his manner while still in her late teens, prior to her marriage in 1674, the absence of proof to the contrary does not constitute support for Binstock's provocative suggestion."

In response to the National Gallery of Art's de-attribution announcement, Eric Jan Sluijter, professor of art history emeritus at the University of Amsterdam, argued that although the NGA's research was "hard to dismiss", he did not think they were indisputably right on all details. He noted that Girl with the Red Hat is also painted on wood, it is a similar composition to Girl with a Flute, and in his view it has similar deviations from Vermeer's technique. Rijksmuseum curator Pieter Roelofs decided to label the painting as an authentic Vermeer in the Rijksmuseum's 2023 Vermeer exhibition, the biggest Vermeer exhibition ever with 27 paintings aside from Girl with a Flute.

== Restorations ==
The painting has undergone restorations, which have received critiques from art historians and art conservationists.

In his 1995 book Johannes Vermeer, Arthur K. Wheelock Jr. wrote:

Although the discolored varnish and old repaint that distorted the image were removed during the painting's restoration in 1995, even now extensive abrasion of the paint surface hinders a conclusive assessment of artistic quality. The blue glaze that once covered the back or the chair, for example, has now mostly disappeared, leaving visible only the reddish-brown underpaint. Nevertheless, the restoration and related technical examinations have provided a fuller understanding of both the complex compositional alterations and the sequence of paint layers that comprise this image, information essential for any informed judgment of attribution.

Some of the modern restorations have received criticism, most vocally from Michael Daley of ArtWatch UK. In December 1995 he wrote to The Times: "The many dramatic changes evident in paintings cleaned for the Vermeer exhibition at the National Gallery in Washington constitute yet another art restoration debacle. ... Neither the catalogue nor reviews of the exhibition mention that the Young Girl with a Flute has lost four fifths of her necklace."

In 2001, presenting photographs of the painting from 1941, 1958, 1994, and 1995, Daley wrote:

In the first [restoration] ... a great loss of material and shading occurred; an eyebrow disappeared; and the necklace was substantially thinned. After the next cleaning ... the restorer lost the central section of the necklace and painted-out the surviving remnant on the right to minimise the glaring injury. The restorer also painted out an earlier striped disfigurement on the sitter’s left cheek, which action left the lit side of the face flatter and less tonally modulated than in 1941. When exhibited in a major Vermeer anniversary exhibition, no Vermeer scholar commented on its cumulative losses and alterations. The two dark stripes on the right-hand, lit side of the hat ... have disappeared.

In the spring of 2022, a thesis for the University of Delaware on art conservation noted, "Within conservation treatments, restoration has proved to have a more damaging effect on material culture if not executed correctly. ... The news of [the 2012 botched 'restoration' of the Ecce Homo fresco of Christ in Borja, Spain] surfaced hundreds of reports of failed restorations such as ... Vermeer's Girl with a Flute."

In January 2023, Daley wrote to The Guardian stating:

If Girl With a Flute at Washington's National Gallery of Art ever was a Vermeer, successive picture restorers have made sure that it no longer is so. In 1940, it was judged a Vermeer on its "utmost delicacy of glaze and stipple".

You report that the paint has now been found (after two restorations by the museum) to be "heavy-handed" in a way that "pooled and almost dripped". Distinct features on the painting were lost or weakened in each restoration. Before the first, the girl had a solid necklace, dark eyebrows and a strongly lit and shaded face. Those features were greatly weakened and the necklace was left much thinner with a small break in the first restoration. In the second, ahead of the previous travelling Vermeer blockbuster exhibitions of 1995-96, published photographs showed that all the features were further weakened and the necklace had lost its central section. After that cleaning, the remains of the necklace were almost, but not entirely, painted out by the restorer.

ArtWatch first complained of these restorations in 1995 and, in 2001, we published photographs showing the succession of injuries. So far as we know, none of the art historians now squabbling over the attribution have discussed the restoration injuries.
