= Girl with a Pearl Earring =

1665 painting by Johannes Vermeer

- Meisje met de parel (Dutch)
- Artist: Johannes Vermeer
- Year: c. 1665
- Type: Tronie
- Medium: Oil on canvas
- Movement: Dutch Golden Age painting
- Dimensions: 44.5 cm × 39 cm (17.5 in × 15 in)
- Location: Mauritshuis, The Hague, Netherlands

Girl with a Pearl Earring (Dutch: Meisje met de parel) is an oil painting by Dutch Golden Age painter Johannes Vermeer, dated c. 1665. Going by various names over the centuries, it acquired its present title towards the end of the 20th century. The work has been in the collection of the Mauritshuis in The Hague since 1902 and has been the subject of various literary and cinematic treatments.

== Description ==
The painting is a tronie, the Dutch 17th-century description of a "head" that was not meant to be a portrait. It depicts a European girl wearing "exotic dress", an "oriental turban", and what appears to be a very large pearl as an earring. The work is oil on canvas and is 44.5 cm (17.5 in) tall by 39 cm (15 in) wide. It is signed "IVMeer" but not dated. It is estimated to have been painted around 1665.

The most recent (1994) restoration of the painting brought out hidden subtleties in the colour scheme and deepened the intimacy of the girl's gaze towards the viewer. In 2014, Dutch astrophysicist Vincent Icke raised doubts about the material of the earring, arguing that it looks more like polished tin than pearl on the grounds of the specular reflection, and because of its large size. The dark space around the figure, described as a uniform background with a dark green–brown colour in the early twentieth century, was interpreted as flat until research in 2018 indicated that Vermeer had modelled diagonal lines at the right side, suggesting folds in fabric, perhaps a curtain, by varying the amount of lead white in the semi-translucent green glaze applied over the black underlayer. Two organic pigments (indigo and weld) in that glaze have faded over time.

The identity of the subject is disputed. She may have been real or imagined, or she might represent a Sibyl or a biblical figure. Some authors, such as Jean-Louis Vaudoyer and Lawrence Weschler, believed her to be the artist's eldest daughter, Maria, though other art historians dismiss this speculation as an anachronism. Art historian Andrew Graham-Dixon believes that the subject of the painting was Magdalena, the 12-year-old daughter of Vermeer's chief patron Pieter Claesz van Ruijven, who lived in a house called the Golden Eagle in the Old Town area of Delft. Her family were Remonstrants, for whom the biblical Mary Magdalene was an important figure, and the portrait with its biblical style of clothing could have been painted to commemorate Magdalena's baptism into the church.

== Ownership and display ==
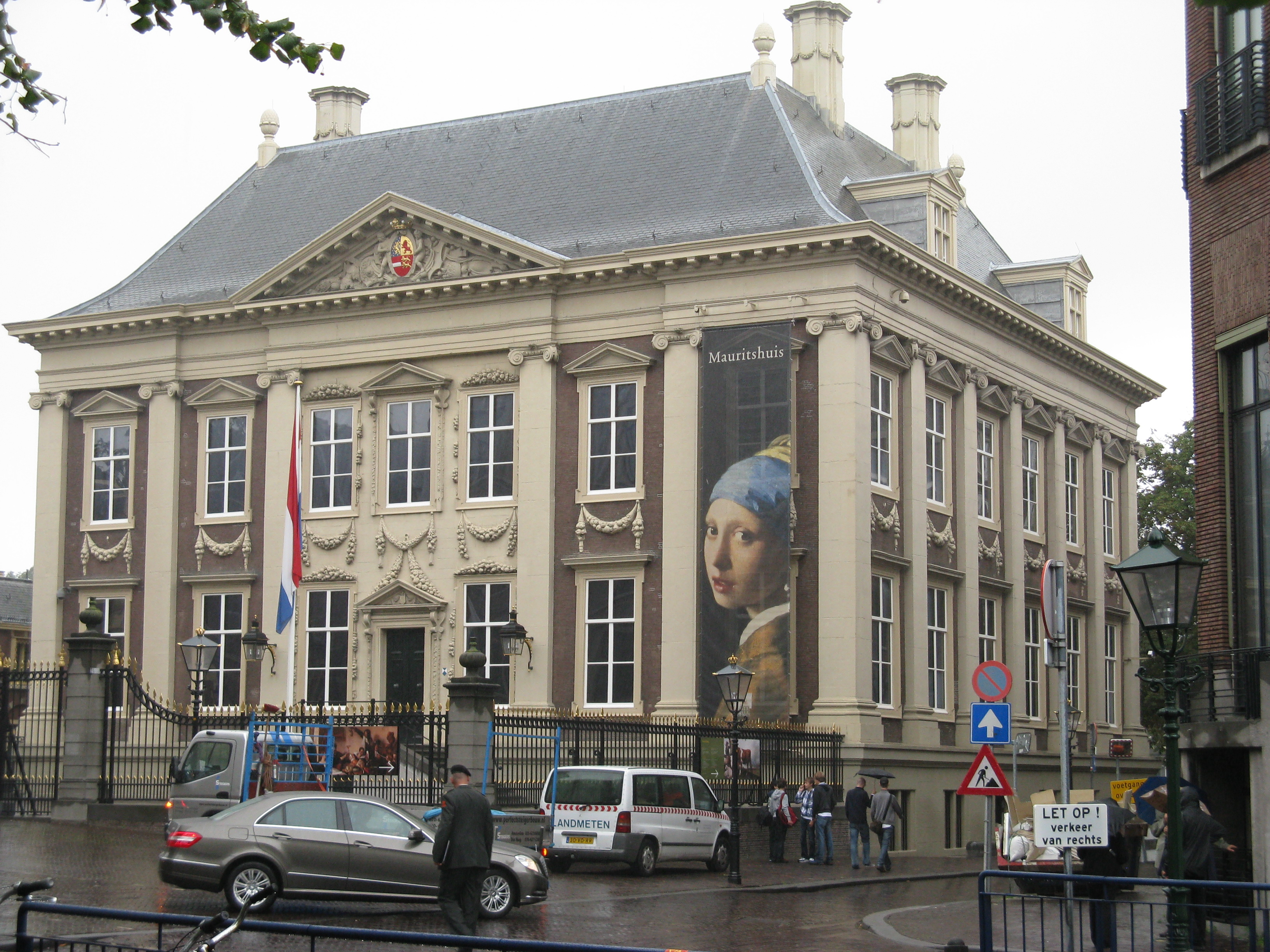
The Mauritshuis in The Hague, 2011, showing a representation of the painting at right

On the advice of Victor de Stuers, who for years tried to prevent Vermeer's rare works from being sold to parties abroad, Arnoldus Andries des Tombe purchased the work at an auction in The Hague in 1881, for only two guilders plus thirty cents buyer's premium (equivalent to roughly €24 in 2015). At the time, it was in poor condition, with parts of the paint layer having become detached. Des Tombe had no heirs and by a bequest donated this and other paintings to the Mauritshuis in 1902. During the Nazi occupation of the Netherlands, the painting was kept hidden in a bombproof bunker located just below the Mauritshuis for two years, before removal to the St. Pietersberg caves near Maastricht until the liberation of the Netherlands in May 1945.

The painting has since been widely exhibited about the world until 2014, when it returned to the Mauritshuis permanently for display in the collection. By that time, as a result of its promotion, a CNN survey named it one of the world's most recognizable paintings.

== Painting technique ==
The painting has been studied by the scientists of the Netherlands Institute for Cultural Heritage and the FOM Institute for Atomic and Molecular Physics (AMOLF) Amsterdam.

The ground is dense and yellowish in colour and is composed of chalk, lead white, ochre, and very little black. The dark background of the painting contains bone black, weld (luteolin, Reseda luteola), chalk, small amounts of red ochre, and indigo. The face and draperies were painted mainly using ochres, natural ultramarine, bone black, charcoal black, and lead white.

In February–March 2018, an international team of art experts spent two weeks studying the painting in a specially constructed glass workshop in the museum, open to observation by the public. The non-invasive research project involved the removal of the work from its frame for study with microscopes, and the use of X-ray and other scanning equipment to better understand the methods and materials used by Vermeer. The project, named The Girl in the Spotlight, was headed by Abbie Vandivere, conservator at the Mauritshuis. Results were published by the Mauritshuis. A blog by Vandivere discusses the project at greater length.

Results included the presence of delicate eyelashes, a green curtain behind the head, changes made, and details of the pigments used and where they came from. The absence of eyebrows and the featureless background had led to speculation that Vermeer was painting an idealised or abstract face; the later discoveries showed that he was painting a real person in a real space. The pearl has been described as an illusion due to having "no contour and also no hook to hang it from the girl's ear".

== Painting title ==
Throughout history and in various parts of the world, the painting has been known by several titles. Originally it may have been one of the two tronies "painted in the Turkish fashion" (Twee tronijnen geschildert op sijn Turx) recorded in the inventory at the time of Vermeer's death. It may later have been the work appearing in the catalogue to a 1696 sale of painting in Amsterdam, where it is described as a "Portrait in Antique Costume, uncommonly artistic" (Een Tronie in Antique Klederen, ongemeen konstig).

After the bequest to the Mauritshuis, the painting became known as Girl with a Turban (Meisje met tulband) and it was noted of its original description in the 1675 inventory that the turban had become a fashion accessory of some fascination during the period of European wars against the Turks. By 1995, the title Girl with a Pearl (Meisje met de parel) was considered more appropriate. Pearls, in fact, figure in 21 of Vermeer's pictures, including very prominently in Woman with a Pearl Necklace. Earrings alone are also featured in A Lady Writing a Letter, Study of a Young Woman, Girl with a Red Hat, and Girl with a Flute. Similarly shaped ear-pieces were used as convincing accessories in 20th-century fakes that were briefly attributed to Vermeer, such as Young Woman with a Blue Hat, Smiling Girl and The Lace Maker.

Generally, the English title of the painting was simply Head of a Young Girl, although it was sometimes known as The Pearl. One critic explained that this name was given, not just from the detail of the earring, but because the figure glows with an inner radiance against the dark background. It has also been speculated that the girl may be a Sibyl from Greek mythology or a biblical figure.

== Cultural impact ==
Some of the first literary treatments of the painting were in poems. For Yann Lovelock in his sestina, "Vermeer’s Head of a Girl", it is the occasion for exploring the interplay between imagined beauty interpreted on canvas and living experience. W. S. Di Piero reimagined how the "Girl with Pearl Earring by Johannes Vermeer" might look in the modern setting of Haight Street in San Francisco, while Marilyn Chandler McEntyre commented on the girl's private, self-possessed personality.

There have also been fictional appearances. As La ragazza col turbante (Girl with a Turban, 1986), it features as the general title of Marta Morazzoni’s collection of five short novellas set in the Baroque era. In the course of the title story, a Dutch art dealer sells Vermeer's painting to an eccentric Dane in the year 1658. Indifferent to women in real life, the two men can only respond to the idealization of the feminine in art. Tracy Chevalier's 1999 historical novel Girl with a Pearl Earring fictionalized the circumstances of the painting's creation. There, Vermeer becomes close to a servant whom he uses as an assistant and has sit for him as a model while wearing his wife's earrings. The novel was adapted into a 2003 film of the same name and a 2008 play.

Vermeer's painting was appropriated in 1985 in a work titled Encuentro en la playa (after Vermeer) by the Peruvian painter Herman Braun-Vega. In this allegory of cultural syncretism, the Dutch girl is accompanied by two young mixed-race girls on a beach and personifies the descendants of Europeans living in Latin America. In 2009, the Ethiopian American Awol Erizku recreated Vermeer's painting as a print, centering on a young black woman and replacing the pearl earring with bamboo earrings as a commentary on the lack of black figures in museums and galleries. His piece is titled Girl with a Bamboo Earring. And in 2014, the English street artist Banksy reproduced the painting as a mural in Bristol, incorporating an alarm box in place of the pearl earring and calling the artwork Girl with a Pierced Eardrum.

A climate activist representing the Just Stop Oil campaign attempted to glue his head to the glass protecting Vermeer's painting in October 2022 and was covered in tomato soup by another protester. The gesture did not damage the painting, and three people were arrested for public violence against goods.

== See also ==
- List of paintings by Johannes Vermeer
