= Tim's Vermeer =

- Poster
- Directed by: Teller
- Written by: Penn Jillette; Teller
- Produced by: Penn Jillette; Farley Ziegler
- Cinematography: Shane F. Kelly
- Edited by: Patrick Sheffield
- Music by: Conrad Pope
- Distributed by: Sony Pictures Classics
- Release dates: September 5, 2013 (Toronto International Film Festival); January 31, 2014 (United States, limited)
- Running time: 80 minutes
- Country: United States
- Language: English
- Box office: $1,671,377

Tim's Vermeer is a 2013 documentary film, directed by Teller, produced by his stage partner Penn Jillette and Farley Ziegler, about inventor Tim Jenison's efforts to duplicate the painting techniques of Johannes Vermeer, in order to test his hypothesis that Vermeer painted with the help of optical devices.

The film premiered at the 2013 Toronto International Film Festival and was released in limited theatrical release in the United States by Sony Pictures Classics on January 31, 2014.

== Synopsis ==
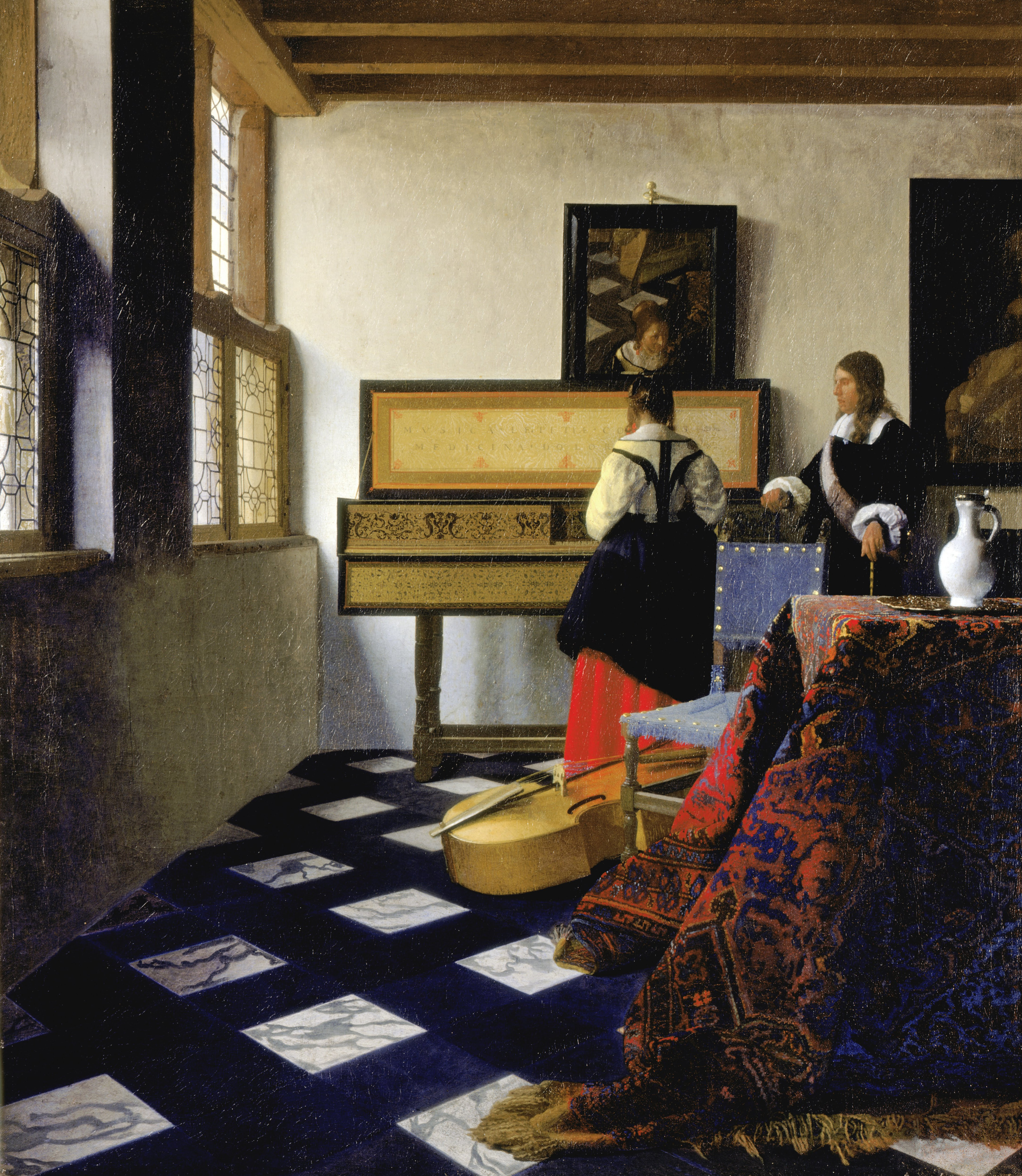
The Music Lesson by Johannes Vermeer

Tim Jenison is an inventor and successful founder of NewTek, a company working in various fields of computer graphics, most notably the 3D modeling software "LightWave 3D." Jenison, himself both an engineer and art enthusiast, becomes fascinated with the paintings of Johannes Vermeer, a 17th-century Dutch painter whose paintings have often been said to exhibit a photographic quality. Jenison, spurred by the 2001 book Secret Knowledge by British artist David Hockney and Vermeer's Camera by British architecture professor Philip Steadman, theorizes that Vermeer potentially used a camera obscura to guide his painting technique, though this knowledge had been around for some time, it's even included in the Ladybird Book "Great Artists: Book 1" from 1970.

His initial idea, that Vermeer used a simple light projection to paint, is quickly discarded after concluding that painting over a projection makes it nearly impossible to match the colors correctly. Jenison then has an epiphany of using a mirror to monitor parts of the picture: by placing a small, fixed mirror above the canvas at a 45-degree angle, he is able to view parts of the original image and the canvas simultaneously, and obtain a precise color match by continuously comparing the reflection of the original image with what he has put on the canvas, moving from area to area by simply moving his own point-of-view slightly. When the edge of the mirror "disappears," he has it right.

Building a quick, crude prototype and using a photographic portrait of his father-in-law, Jenison produces an oil painting that looks nearly identical to the photograph. After building a prototype with a lens that is able to capture a real-life object, Steadman and Jenison, neither of whom has classic artistic education, take turns painting and produce an impressive oil painting of a vase. Both Hockney and Steadman note that their respective books have caused controversies in the art historian circles, who viewed the hypothesis as an "intrusion of crass rationalists" and "the misunderstanding of the nature of art."

Jenison believes he may be able to reproduce The Music Lesson as a painting with this technique, and plans to physically recreate the original scene; first he models the entire painting in LightWave, then proceeds with a painstaking process of re-creating the objects and setting within the original scene which includes him doing woodworking, carpentry, sawing a lathe in half, and almost seven months of handiwork. Jenison also insists on using only techniques and tools available to Vermeer in the 17th century, mixing his own paint and polishing his own lens. Once the scene is set and is visually identical to the original painting, Jenison sits down and meticulously begins to paint.

During his process, he observes a variety of oddities of Vermeer's work that he attributes to the hypothesis of Vermeer having mechanical help: He notes Vermeer's hyper-accurate recreation of diffuse lighting would be impossible to recreate by simple eyesight because of color constancy. He also observes that some of Vermeer's work features chromatic aberration and bokeh depth of field, two distinct features of a photographic lens but not of the human eye. While painting the virginal, he accidentally notices that while he used a straightedge to roughly sketch out the outline of the instrument, the curvature of the lens almost caused him to add a slight curvature to the virginal's seahorse-pattern itself. Curious, he looks at a print of the original painting and notices that the original painting has the same curvature in the pattern.

After four months, Jenison finally finishes painting the picture, and after adding a layer of varnish, he has an emotional moment taking a final look at his work. Observing the results of his work, Steadman and Hockney both feel confident in their hypothesis that Vermeer had been using the same (or similar) tools to create his paintings, noting that "the painting itself is a document." The final shot of the film is Jenison with his copy of The Music Lesson above his fireplace.

== Reception ==
Tim's Vermeer has been met with positive reviews from film reviewers and technology enthusiasts. On Rotten Tomatoes, the film holds a rating of 89% based on 107 reviews with the consensus reading: "Entertaining and profound in equal measure, Tim's Vermeer uses its seemingly esoteric subject to pose fascinating questions about art and obsession." On Metacritic, the film has a score of 76 out of 100, based on 32 critics, indicating "generally favorable" reviews.

The film was nominated for the BAFTA Award for Best Documentary and shortlisted for the Academy Award for Best Documentary Feature in 2014.

Art critics Jonathan Jones and Bendor Grosvenor have criticized the film and disagreed with its conclusions. Jones wrote in the Guardian: "The technology Jenison relies on can replicate art, but it does so synthetically, with no understanding of art's inner life. The 'Vermeer' it spits out is a stillborn simulacrum."

== See also ==
- Hockney–Falco thesis
- Camera lucida
