= Woman Holding a Balance =

1662–1663 painting by Johannes Vermeer

A Woman Holding a Balance
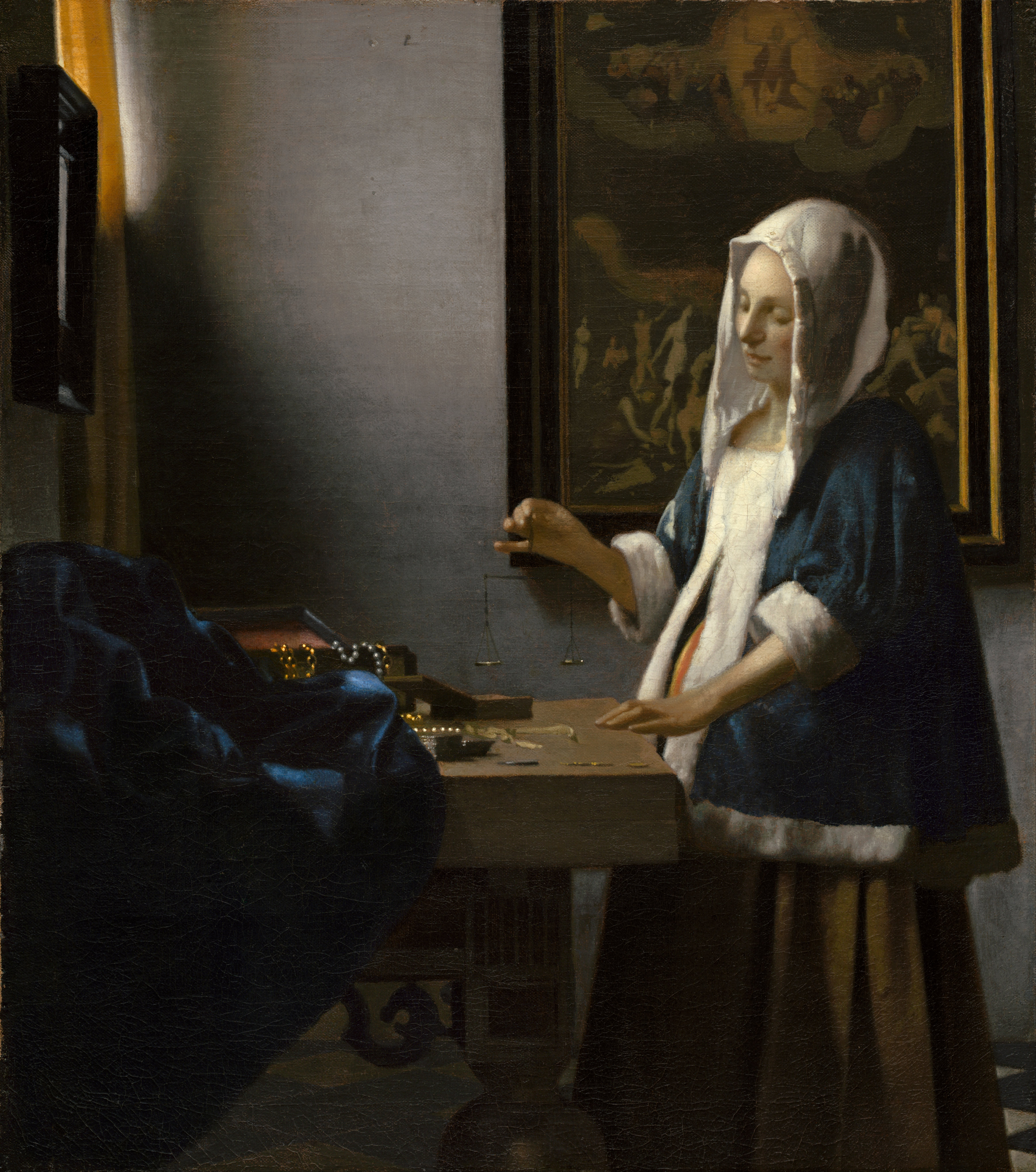
- Artist: Johannes Vermeer
- Year: c. 1662–1663
- Medium: Oil on canvas
- Movement: Dutch Golden Age painting
- Dimensions: 42.5 cm × 38 cm (16.7 in × 15 in)
- Location: National Gallery of Art; Washington, D.C.

Woman Holding a Balance (Dutch: Vrouw met weegschaal), also called Woman Testing a Balance, is an oil painting by Dutch Golden Age painter Johannes Vermeer, now in the National Gallery of Art in Washington, DC.

At one time the painting, completed c. 1662–1663, was known as Woman Weighing Gold, but closer evaluation has determined that the balance in her hand is empty. Opinions on the theme and symbolism of the painting differ, with the woman alternatively viewed as a symbol of holiness or earthliness.

== Theme ==
In the painting, Vermeer has depicted what discreetly appears to be a young pregnant woman holding an empty balance before a table on which stands an open jewelry box, the pearls and gold within spilling over. A blue cloth rests in the left foreground, beneath a mirror, and a window to the left — unseen save its golden curtain — provides light. Behind the woman is a painting of the Last Judgment featuring Christ with raised, outstretched hands. The woman may have been modeled on Vermeer's wife, Catharina Vermeer.

According to Robert Huerta in Vermeer and Plato: Painting the Ideal (2005), the image has been variously "interpreted as a vanitas painting, as a representation of divine truth or justice, as a religious meditative aid, and as an incitement to lead a balanced, thoughtful life." Some viewers have imagined the woman is weighing her valuables, while others compare her actions to Christ's, reading parable into the pearls. Some art critics, including John Michael Montias who describes her as "symbolically weighing unborn souls", have seen the woman as a figure of Mary. To some critics who perceive her as measuring her valuables, the juxtaposition with the final judgement suggests that the woman should be focusing on the treasures of Heaven rather than those of Earth, with the mirror on the wall reinforcing the vanity of her pursuits. Other historians have suggested that the balance represents her careful harmonization of worldly possessions and spiritual piety. In this interpretation, the mirror on the wall reflects the woman's self-knowledge.

== History ==
Completed in 1662 or 1663, the painting was previously called Woman Weighing Gold before microscopic evaluation confirms that the balance in her hands is empty. The painting was among the large collection of Vermeer works sold on May 16, 1696, in Amsterdam from the estate of Jacob Dissius (1653–1695). It received 155 guilders, considerably above the prices fetched at the time for his Girl Asleep at a Table (62) and The Officer and the Laughing Girl (approximately 44), but somewhat below The Milkmaid (177).

== Painting materials ==
The first pigment analysis of this painting by Hermann Kühn revealed the use of ultramarine for the blue tablecloth and lead white for the grey wall. The pigment in the bright yellow curtain was at first misidentified as Indian yellow. The subsequent technical investigations of the painting by Robert L. Feller (1974) and M.E. Gifford (1994) have shown that the painting had been extended by approximately five centimetres on every side at a much later date. The sample investigated by H. Kühn in 1968 was unfortunately taken from this extension. The proper pigment of the yellow curtain is lead-tin-yellow. The full pigment analysis according to the latest data is illustrated at Colourlex.

== See also ==
- List of paintings by Johannes Vermeer
