= View of Delft =

1660–1661 painting by Johannes Vermeer

- Zicht op Delft (Dutch)
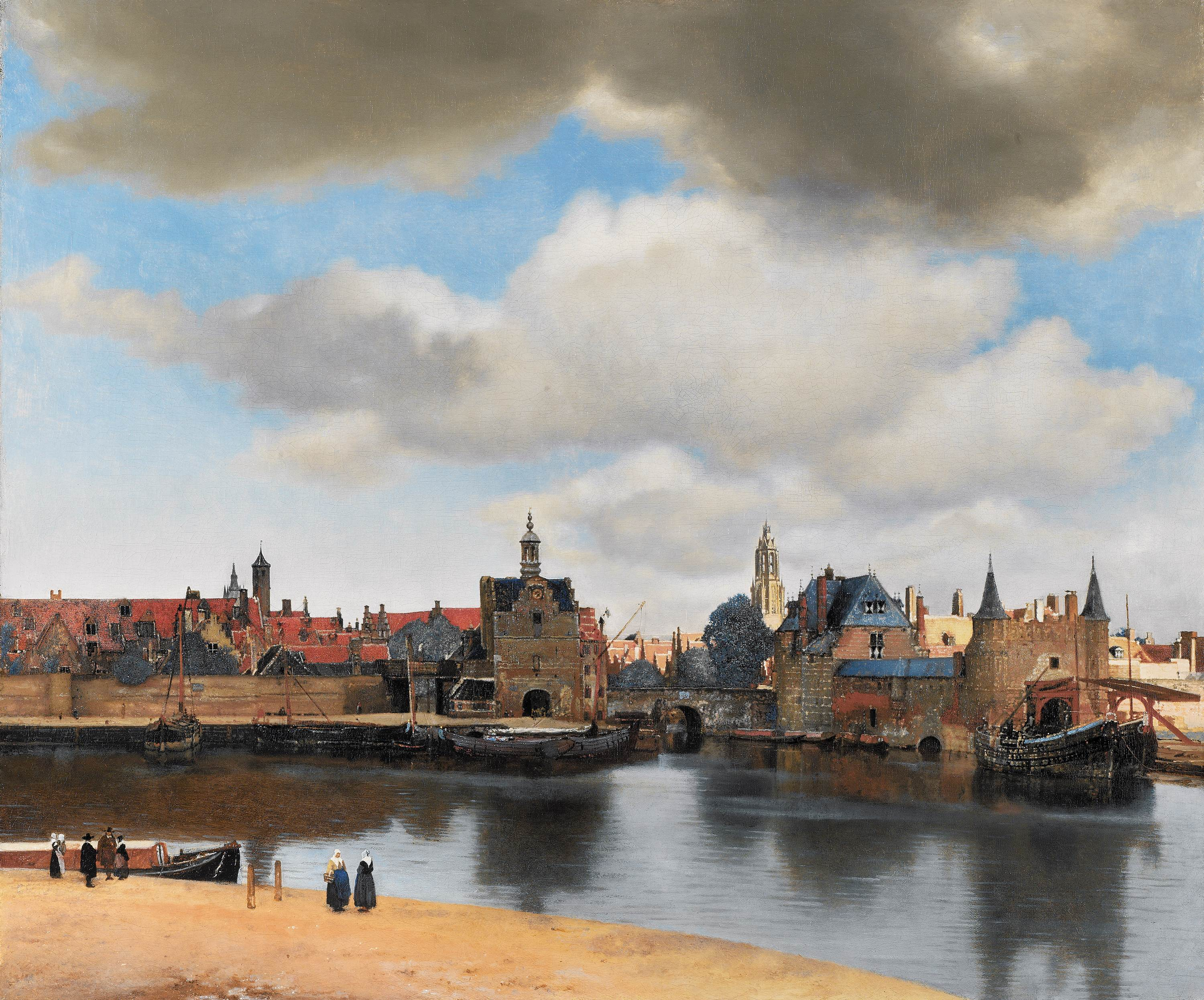
- Artist: Johannes Vermeer
- Year: c. 1660–1661
- Medium: Oil on canvas
- Movement: Baroque painting, Dutch Golden Age painting
- Dimensions: 96.5 cm × 115.7 cm (38.0 in × 45.6 in)
- Location: Mauritshuis; The Hague

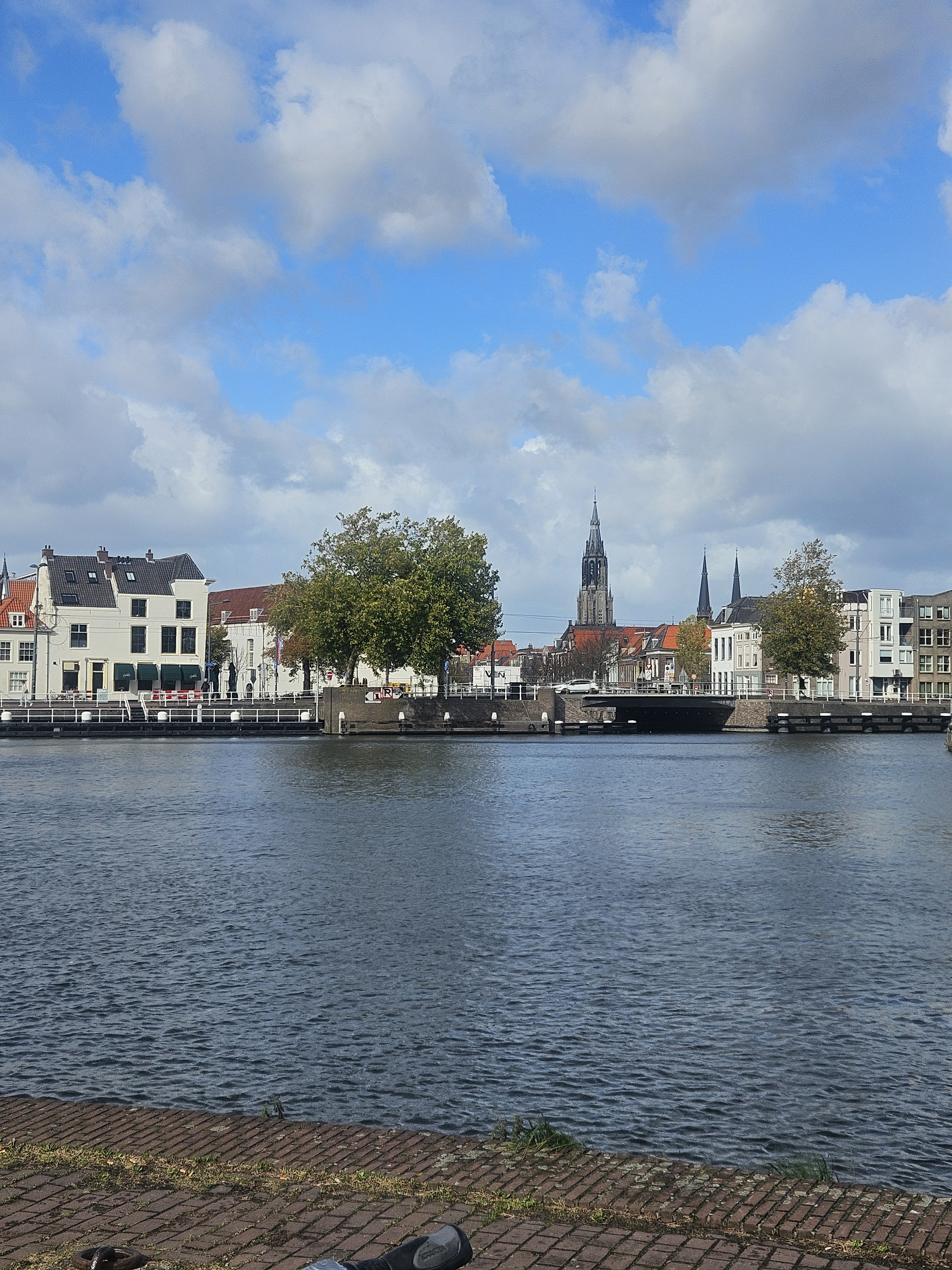
Modern-day photograph of the approximate location where Vermeer painted the painting.

View of Delft (Dutch: Zicht op Delft) is an oil painting by Johannes Vermeer, painted c. 1659–1661. The painting of the Dutch artist's hometown is among his best known. It is one of three known paintings of Delft by Vermeer, along with The Little Street and the lost painting House Standing in Delft, and his only cityscape. According to art historian Emma Barker, cityscapes across water, which were popular in the Netherlands at the time, celebrated the city and its trade. Vermeer's View of Delft has been held in the Dutch Royal Cabinet of Paintings at the Mauritshuis in The Hague since its establishment in 1822.

The painting was featured in the 1980 BBC Two series 100 Great Paintings.

== Description ==
A technical analysis shows that Vermeer used calcite, lead white, yellow ochre, natural ultramarine, and madder lake pigments.

The landscape was painted from an elevated position to the southeast of Delft, possibly the upper floor of the Mechelen tavern where the artist's studio was located. To the very right of the painting is a medieval brick building called the Rotterdam Gate, in front of which are two herring busses. It is one of two gates on Delft's south side, the other being the Schiedam Gate, shown in the middle of the composition. There is a bridge between the Rotterdam Gate and the Schiedam Gate, which has a clock on its roof. Behind the Schiedam Gate is a long red-roofed arsenal now known as the Legermuseum. The buildings are reflected in the calm harbour of the river Schie, which was colloquially known as the Kolk (pond).

On the lower left side of the painting, five people are waiting to board a passenger barge to take them to Rotterdam, Schiedam, or Delfshaven. The passenger barge was pulled by a horse and could hold up to thirty people. Vermeer painted his initials, VM, on the red interior of the barge. To the barge's right are two women talking to each other. Vermeer originally painted a third person next to them, but later changed his mind and painted him out.

Behind the Rotterdam Gate is the illuminated spire of the Nieuwe Kerk. In reality, the Nieuwe Kerk would be positioned more toward the right, but Vermeer depicted it closer to the center to make it more prominent. There are no bells in the tower in this painting as those would not be added to the church until after the painting was completed in 1661. The Nieuwe Kerk was where Vermeer was baptized at one to two weeks old, and where his mother and elder sister were buried. In the background is the top of the tower of the Oude Kerk ("Old Church") which was built around 1246, making it Delft's oldest parish church. Vermeer is buried there.

== Camera obscura ==
Historians have hotly debated whether or not Vermeer used a camera obscura. A camera obscura, meaning "dark chamber," was a closed room with a small hole covered with a convex lens through which light could pass, casting a reverse image onto the wall that the artist could then trace. There is no documentary evidence that Vermeer used a camera obscura, but there are several clues that could point to its usage. In The Officer and the Laughing Girl, the man appears to be significantly larger than the woman, which could be a result of using a camera obscura. Another piece of evidence pointing to Vermeer's use of a camera obscura is his detailed maps, which would be very difficult to reproduce without the aid of optical technology. Other artists were known to use a camera obscura for this very purpose. A third piece of evidence is found in Girl with a Red Hat. Without a camera obscura, the light on the lions' heads would be rectangular, as the light would be coming from a window with rectangular panes, but Vermeer has painted the light as circles, an effect that would be created by viewing the image through a lens. Because of the diffused highlights painted on the buildings and in the water, art historian Arthur K. Wheelock Jr. believes that Vermeer did use a camera obscura to create View of Delft. Other historians are not as convinced. Art historian Karl Schütz insists that Vermeer never used a camera obscura in any painting.

== Political interpretation ==
Vermeer's illumination of the Nieuwe Kerk shows his support (or his patron's support) for the House of Orange. From 1648–1650, William II of Orange and the States General argued over whether or not to reduce the country's military budget. William II wanted to keep the soldiers who had fought in the war against the Spanish in case they decided to attack again, but the States General felt that the country was already in too much debt to afford a military. Dutch society was split into two factions – those who supported the House of Orange, and those who supported the States General. After William II died and the States General assumed power, people who wanted to show support for the House of Orange commissioned artwork of William of Orange's tomb, which was housed in the Nieuwe Kerk. The Nieuwe Kerk is brightly illuminated in View of Delft to show support for the Dutch monarchy.

== Comparison with other paintings ==
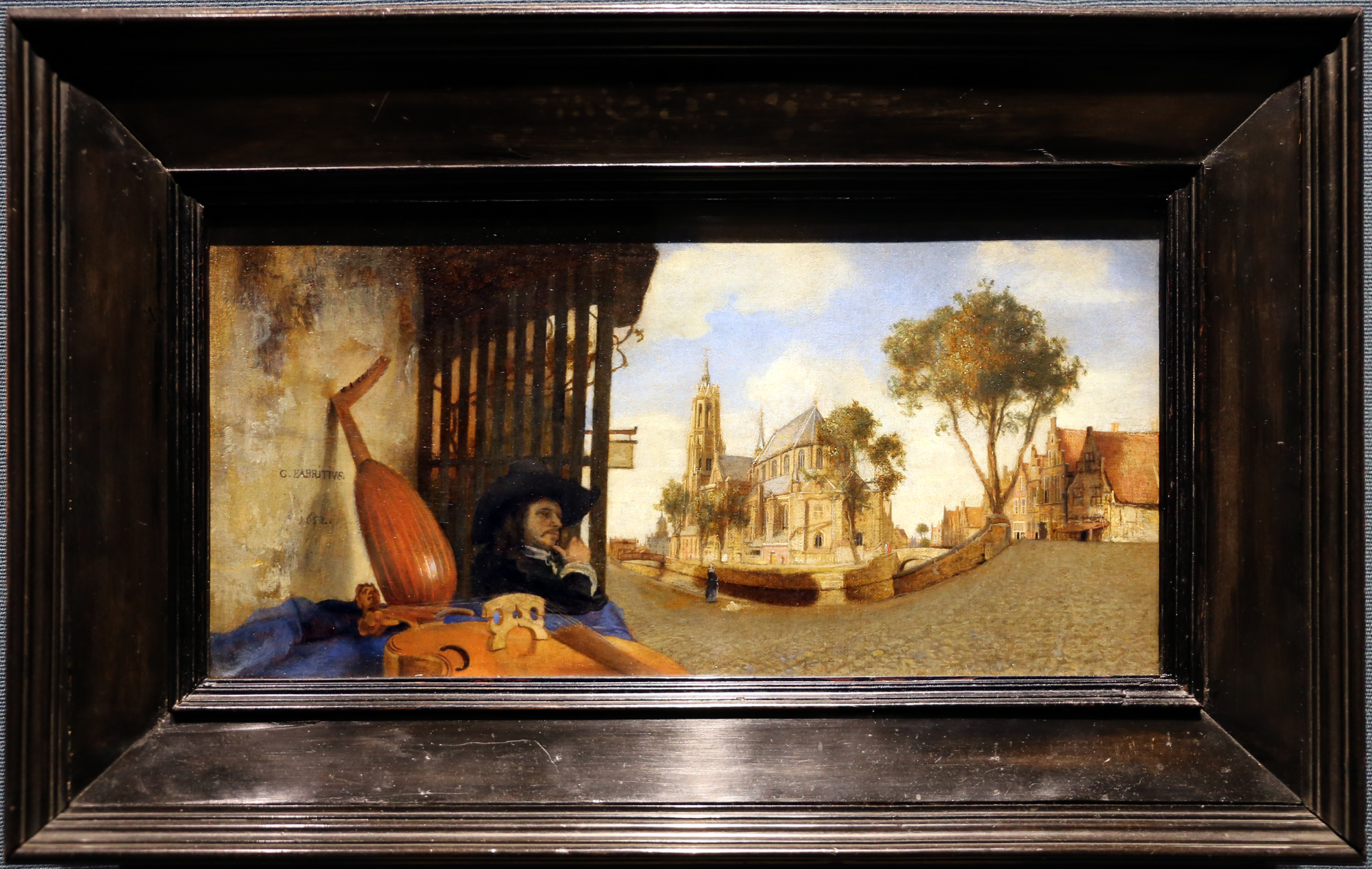
Carel fabritius, veduta di delft con banco di venditore di strumenti musicali (Carel Fabritius, view of Delft with vendor counter of musical instruments), 1652

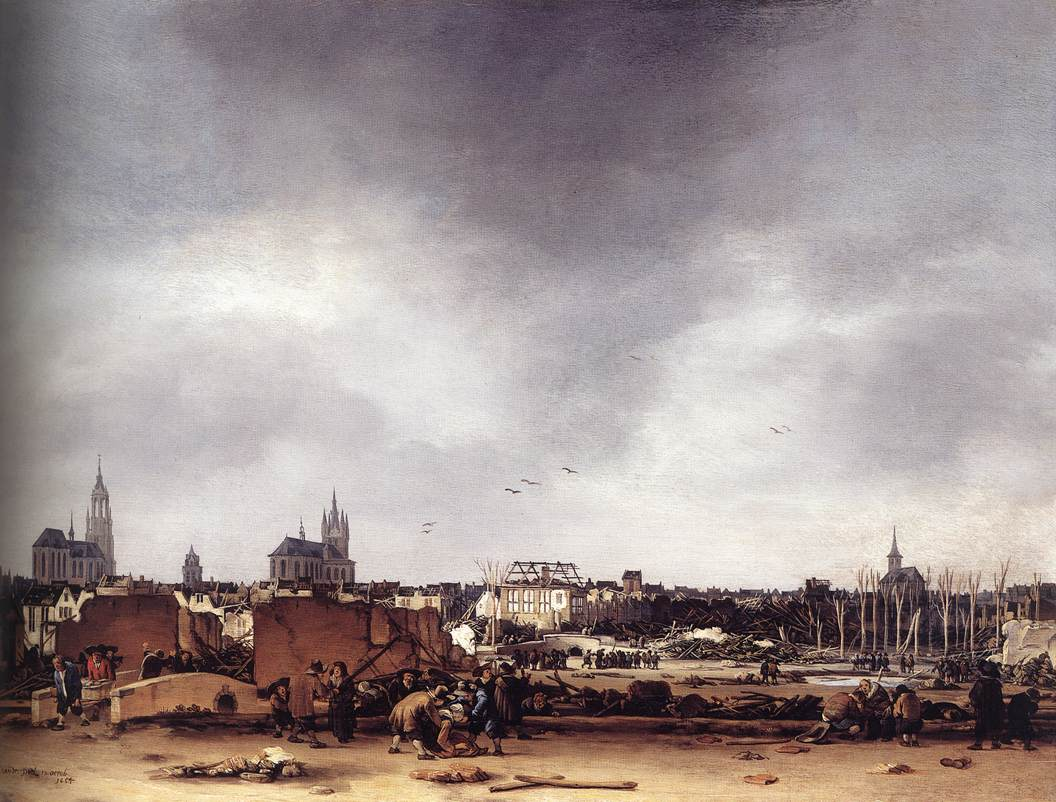
View of Delft Explosion of 1654 by Egbert van der Poel

Delft was also painted by Hendrick Cornelisz Vroom in View of Delft from the North-west and View of Delft from the South-west (1615), Carel Fabritius in A View of Delft (1652), Egbert van der Poel in View of Delft Explosion of 1654 (after the explosion of 1654), and Pieter Wouwerman in View of the horse market in Delft (1665). Vroom was most known for his seascapes, which is why his views of Delft focus on the river Schie rather than the buildings of the town. Like Vermeer's painting, Fabritius's A View of Delft features the Nieuwe Kerk. This painting was likely meant to be seen in a perspective box through a peephole as a trompe l'œil (trick of the eye), which would trick the viewer's eye into seeing a three-dimensional view of the street. Van der Poel's painting shows both the Nieuwe Kerk and the Oude Kerk, as well as the chapel of the hospital of St. George. The scene depicts the town after 40,000 kg of gunpowder exploded, killing hundreds of people including Carel Fabritius. Despite the devastation, the two churches still stand. Unlike other paintings of Delft which feature a busy harbour, Vermeer only painted a few boats. Vermeer also painted Delft from the south side instead of the more popular north side, as the south side was the only part of the town where buildings were left untouched by the Delft Thunderclap (explosion).

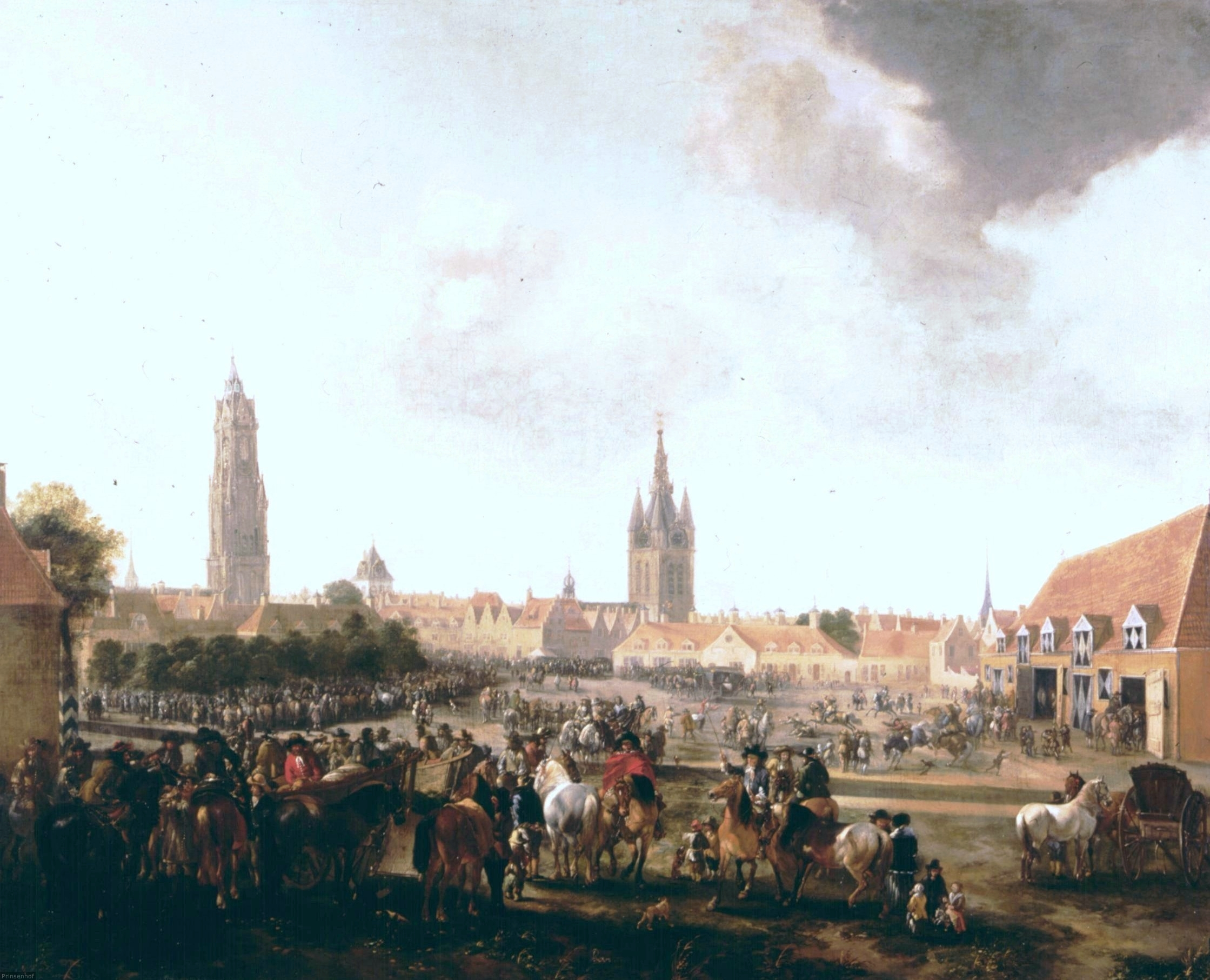
Pieter Wouwerman – Gezicht op de Paardenmarkt te Delft ("View of the Paardenmarkt in Delft"), 1665

== Patronage and provenance ==
Pieter Claeszoon van Ruijven, a lover of architectural paintings, commissioned View of Delft along with The Little Street. Van Ruijven was a native of Delft and eight years Vermeer's senior. He may have been introduced to Vermeer by his brother, Jan van Ruijven, the notary who documented Vermeer's marriage to Catharina Bolnes. It is known for certain, however, that in 1657 van Ruijven lent Vermeer 200 guilders. He left 500 guilders in his will for Vermeer and specifically worded the document so that Catharina Bolnes would not inherit the money. Vermeer was the only person named in the will who was not part of his or his wife's family. After van Ruijven's death, View of Delft was inherited by his daughter Magdalena. It was auctioned by her husband Jacob Dissius on 16 May 1696 for 200 guilders. This works out to about $21,000 in 2026. In the eighteenth century it was owned by merchant Willem Philip Kops. After his death it passed on to his wife, who in turn after her death in 1820 passed it on to her daughter, Johanna Kops, who finally decided to auction it. The director of the Mauritshuis at the time, Johan Steengracht van Oostcapelle, instructed the minister not to bid on it as it would not fit in the cabinet. On the other hand, the director of the Rijksmuseum, Cornelius Apostool, urged the minister to ask the king William I for money to buy it. The painting was then sold to the Dutch government in 1822 by S. J. Stinstra of Amsterdam for 2900 guilders. However, the king had it exhibited in the new Dutch Royal Cabinet of Paintings established at the Mauritshuis in The Hague, and not in Amsterdam as expected. The reasons for this decision are not known. It is assumed that William I simply liked the painting or that he saw the depiction of the Nieuwe Kerk as a reminder of his ancestors.

== Legacy ==
Marcel Proust greatly admired Vermeer, and particularly this painting. The painting features in his novel In Search of Lost Time. In Volume One, Swann's Way (published 1913), he has the hero Swann work on a biography of Vermeer (which he writes out Ver Meer). In volume 5 (The Prisoner, published 1923), he has the writer Bergotte die in front of this painting. Before, Bergotte had taken inspiration from Vermeer's technique: "That's how I ought to have written ... My last books are too dry, I ought to have ... made my language precious in itself, like this little patch of yellow wall ('petit pan de mur jaune')". On 1 May 1921, in a letter to his friend Jean-Louis Vaudoyer who had just published an article about the painter, Proust reminded him of his mention of Vermeer in Volume One and described how he felt when he saw the painting for the first time in October 1902:

Ever since I saw the View of Delft in the museum in The Hague, I have known that I had seen the most beautiful painting in the world.

At the end of May 1921, Proust viewed the painting again while visiting an exhibition of Dutch masters at the Jeu de Paume in Paris accompanied by Vaudoyer, and suffered a seizure in front of the painting, which later inspired him to have Bergotte die in front of it.

In 2011, the painting was featured on gold and silver commemorative coins issued by the Royal Dutch Mint.

== See also ==
- List of paintings by Johannes Vermeer
- 100 Great Paintings
