= A Girl Asleep =

1657 painting by Johannes Vermeer

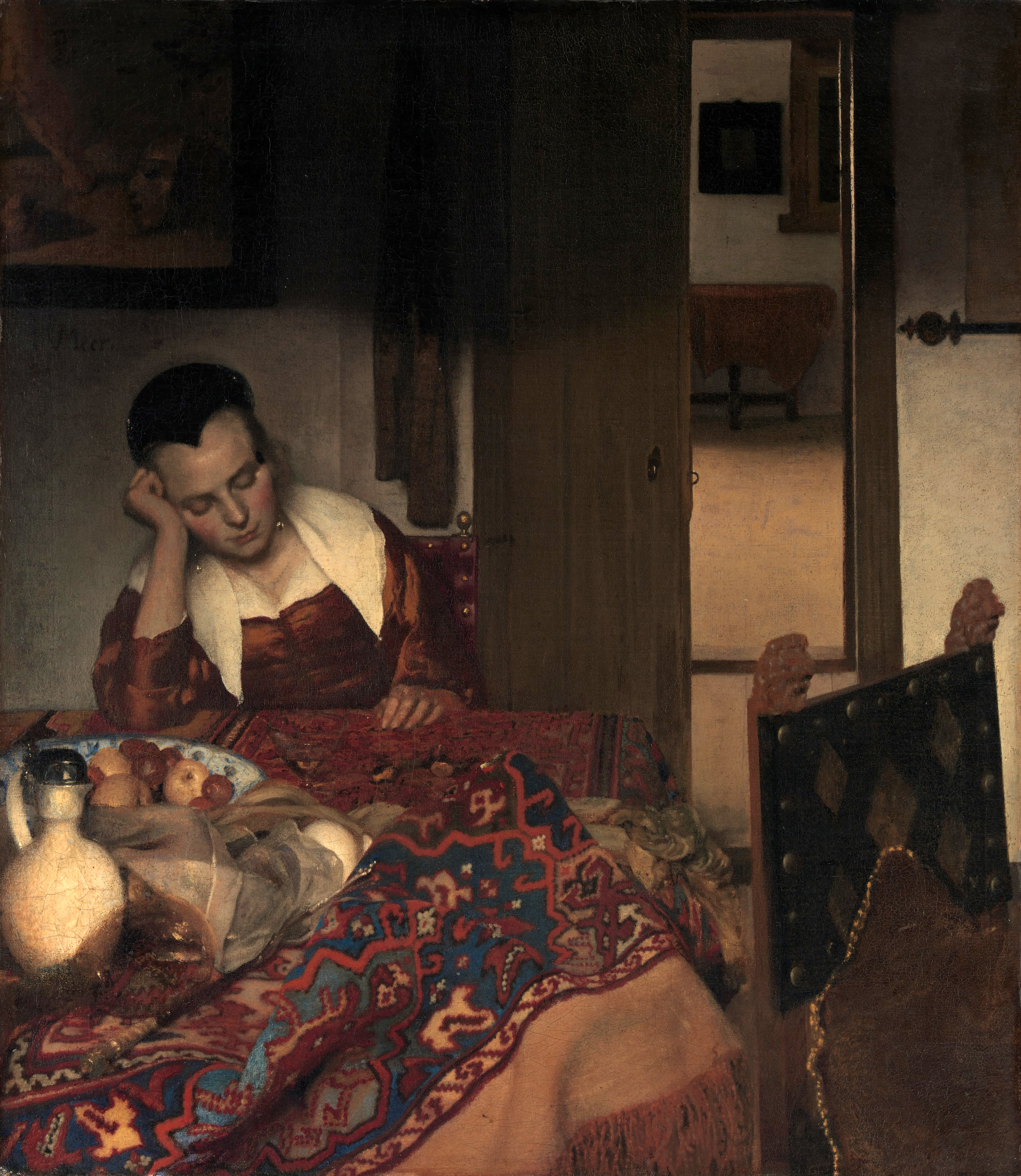
- Artist: Johannes Vermeer
- Year: c. 1657
- Medium: Oil on canvas
- Dimensions: 87.6 cm × 76.5 cm (34.5 in × 30.1 in)
- Location: Metropolitan Museum of Art; New York

A Girl Asleep (Dutch: Slapend meisje), also known as A Woman Asleep, A Woman Asleep at Table, and A Maid Asleep, is a painting by the Dutch master Johannes Vermeer, created c. 1657. It is now in the Metropolitan Museum of Art in New York City and may not be lent elsewhere under the terms of the donor's bequest.

== Theme, influences and composition changes ==
Technical examination of the painting revealed a man in the second room and a dog looking at him. According to Liedtke, the presence of the dog would have alluded to "the sort of impromptu relationships canine suitors strike up on the street." The man and the dog were replaced with a mirror on a far wall, suggesting how the experience of the senses quickly passes, and a chair left at an angle with a pillow on it, possibly signifying indolence, together with a hint of recent company. The idea that she was recently together with someone is reinforced by the wine pitcher, the glass on its side and the possible presence of a knife and fork on the table. The Chinese bowl with fruit is a symbol of temptation, and for a Vermeer contemporary familiar with the symbolism of Dutch art of the time, the knife and jug lying open-mouthed under a gauzy material would have brought to mind more than social intercourse.

The painting was very likely owned by Vermeer's patron, Pieter van Ruijvan, who also owned The Milkmaid, which has a similar tension between the symbolism of sexual or romantic relations with maids and their presentation in a way that was more sympathetic than the established tradition.

== Provenance and exhibitions ==
The painting was among the large collection of Vermeer works sold on May 16, 1696, from the estate of Jacob Dissius (1653–1695). It is widely believed the collection was originally owned by Dissius' father-in-law, Pieter Claesz van Ruijven of Delft as Vermeer's major patron, then passed down to Ruijven's daughter (1655–1682), who would have left it to Dissius. The work's history from that point is unknown until its ownership by John Waterloo Wilson in Paris after 1873. It was sold on March 14, 1881, in Paris when Charles Sedelmeyer's Galerie Sedelmeyer in Paris bought it and sold it later that year to Rodolphe Kann, also of Paris. Kann owned the work until 1907. It was sold in 1908 through the Duveen Brothers of London to Benjamin Altman, and it was exhibited in New York in 1909. Altman owned the work until 1913, when it passed into the hands of the Metropolitan Museum of Art as a bequest.

== See also ==
- List of paintings by Johannes Vermeer
- Dutch Golden Age painting
