= Study of a Young Woman =

1665–1667 painting by Johannes Vermeer

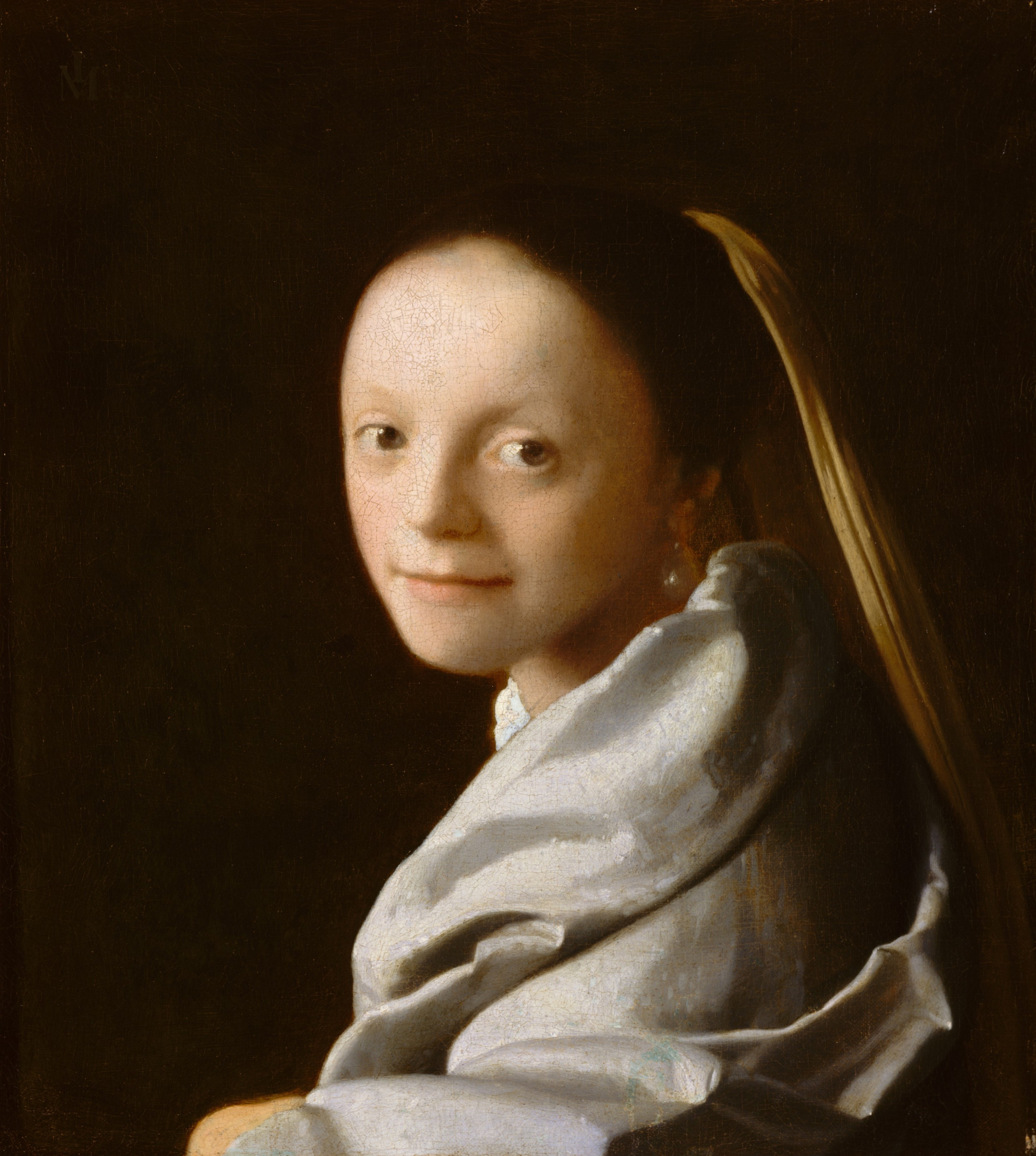
- Artist: Johannes Vermeer
- Year: c. 1665–1667
- Medium: Oil on canvas
- Dimensions: 44.5 cm × 40 cm (17.5 in × 16 in)
- Location: Metropolitan Museum of Art, New York; New York

Study of a Young Woman (also known as Portrait of a Young Woman or Girl with a Veil) is a painting by the Dutch artist Johannes Vermeer, completed between 1665 and 1667, and now in the Metropolitan Museum of Art, New York.

The painting was painted around the same time as the better-known Girl with a Pearl Earring and has a near-identical size. Because of this, and its proximity in tone and composition, it is sometimes considered to be either a variant or pendant painting (counterpart) of Girl with a Pearl Earring. The subjects of both paintings wear pearl earrings, have scarves draped over their shoulders, and are shown in front of a plain black background. In addition, it has been suggested (though this has also been widely contested) that the creation of both works involved the use of some optical device, such as a camera obscura or mirror, as the Hockney–Falco thesis speculates.

== Description ==
The sitter is depicted as having a homely face—widely spaced and flat—with a small nose and thin lips on a relatively large head. The lack of idealised beauty has led to a general belief that this work was painted on commission, although it is possible that the model was Vermeer's daughter. The artist probably used a live model but, as with Girl with a Pearl Earring, did not create the work as a portrait, but as a tronie, a Dutch word meaning "visage" or "expression", a type of Dutch 17th-century picture appreciated for its "unusual costumes, intriguing physiognomies, suggestion of personality, and demonstration of artistic skill". The picture encourages the viewer to be curious about the young woman's thoughts, feelings, or character, something typical in many of Vermeer's paintings.

Girl with a Pearl Earring and Portrait of a Young Woman are unusual for Vermeer in that they lack his usual rich background; instead, the girls are framed by a background of deep black. This isolating effect seems to heighten their vulnerability and seeming desire to place trust in the viewer. In 1994, Edward Snow wrote that Portrait of a Young Woman conveys "the desire for beauty and perfection into a loving acceptance of what is flawed".

== Provenance and exhibitions ==
The painting may have been owned by Pieter Claesz van Ruijven of Delft before 1674, then by his widow, Maria de Knuijt of Delft, until 1681; then their daughter, Magdalena van Ruijven, until 1682; her widower, Jacob Dissius, until 1695. The painting is thought to have been part of the Dissius sale of May 16, 1696 (No. 38, 39 or 40). It probably then belonged to Dr. Luchtmans, who sold it in Rotterdam as part of a sale from April 20–22, 1816 (No. 92) for 3 Dutch guilders (about 30 grams of silver), even then a tiny amount. Prince Auguste Marie Raymond d'Arenberg, of Brussels, owned the painting by 1829, and it remained in his family in Brussels and Schloss Meppen from 1833 to the early 1950s. In 1959 (or 1955, according to another source), it was bought in a private sale from the Prince d'Arenberg by Mr. Charles Wrightsman and Mrs. Jayne Wrightsman of New York for a sum estimated at around £125,000. In 1979, the Wrightsmans donated the picture to the Metropolitan Museum of Art in memory of curator Theodore Rousseau, Jr.

== See also ==
- List of paintings by Johannes Vermeer

== Sources ==
- Bonafoux, Pascal (1992). Vermeer. New York: Konecky & Konecky. ISBN 1-56852-308-4.
- Liedtke, Walter (2001). A View of Delft: Vermeer and his Contemporaries. Yale University Press. ISBN 0-300-09053-6.
- Liedtke, Walter; Plomp, Michiel C.; Rüger, Axel (2001). Vermeer and the Delft School. Yale University Press. ISBN 0-87099-973-7.
- Liedtke, Walter (2007). Dutch Paintings in the Metropolitan Museum of Art, Volumes 1-2. Metropolitan Museum of Art. ISBN 978-1-58839-273-2.
- Snow, Edward (1994). A study of Vermeer. University of California Press. ISBN 0-520-07132-8.
- Wheelock, Arthur K. (1997). Vermeer: The Complete Works. New York: Harry N. Abrams. ISBN 0-8109-2751-9.
