= The Music Lesson =

1662–1665 painting by Johannes Vermeer

- Lady at the Virginals with a Gentleman, Woman Seated at a Virginal
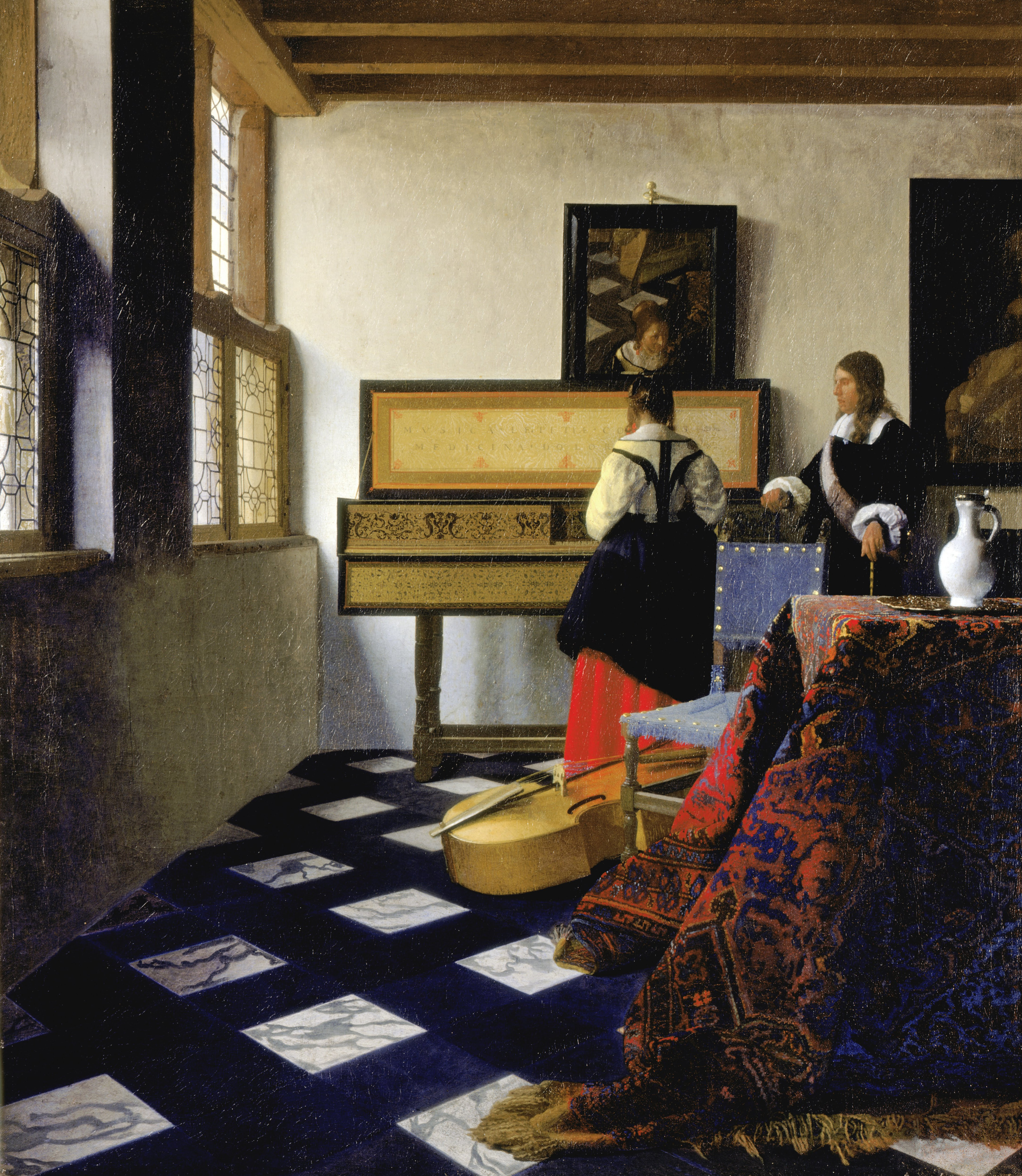
- Artist: Johannes Vermeer
- Year: c. 1662–1665
- Medium: Oil on canvas
- Movement: Baroque painting, Dutch Golden Age painting
- Dimensions: 74.6 cm × 64.1 cm (29.4 in × 25.2 in)
- Location: Picture Gallery, Buckingham Palace, London
- Owner: Royal Collection
- Accession: RCIN 405346

The Music Lesson, Woman Seated at a Virginal or A Lady at the Virginals with a Gentleman by Johannes Vermeer is a painting of a young female pupil playing a virginal during a music lesson with a male teacher. The man's mouth is slightly agape giving the impression that he is singing along with the music that the young girl is playing. This suggests that there is a relationship between the two figures and the idea of love and music being bridged together. This was a common theme among Dutch art in this time period. Vermeer consistently used the same objects within his paintings such as the draped rug, the white water jug, various instruments, tiled floor and windows that convey light and shadows. This is one of few paintings produced by Vermeer which were kept in his home until his death in 1675 when his family was forced to sell them. It became a part of the Royal Collection, and it is currently on display in the Picture Gallery at Buckingham Palace in London.

== Provenance ==
The picture was sold in May 1696 in Delft, part of the collection of Jacob Dissous, which included many Vermeers. It was later acquired by Venetian artist Giovanni Antonio Pellegrini in 1718, with Pellegrini's collection later being bought by Joseph Smith. The Music Lesson has been part of the Royal Collection of Great Britain since 1762, when King George III bought Smith's collection of paintings. When the painting was acquired it was believed to be a work by Frans van Mieris the elder because of a misinterpretation of the signature. It was not correctly attributed to Vermeer until 1866 by Théophile Thoré, though some scholars were skeptical whether it was Vermeer or not. It has at various times been kept at both Buckingham Palace and Windsor Castle, and is depicted in Charles Wild's Windsor Castle: the King's Closet, 1816, a watercolour prepared for William Pyne's History of the Royal Residences.

== Painting materials ==
The painting was investigated by Hermann Kühn in 1968 and there is also material on the pigment analysis on the website of the National Gallery in London where the painting was included in the exhibition "Vermeer and Music: The Art of Love and Leisure" in 2013. The Music Lesson is a mature work of Vermeer and his handling of color and his choice of painting materials is but one of the aspects proving his mastery. The painting is dominated by dark areas such as the bluish-black floor painted in bone black with the addition of natural ultramarine.

== In popular culture ==
The 2013 documentary film Tim's Vermeer documents inventor and entrepreneur Tim Jenison's attempt to recreate The Music Lesson to test his theory that Vermeer painted with the help of optical devices. Jenison is given the opportunity for a brief private viewing of the painting at Buckingham Palace. The film's claim that Vermeer used something similar to Jenison's technique has been controversial and was derided by the art critic Jonathan Jones.

== See also ==
- List of paintings by Johannes Vermeer
- Dutch Golden Age painting
