= Girl with a Red Hat =

1665–1666 painting by Johannes Vermeer

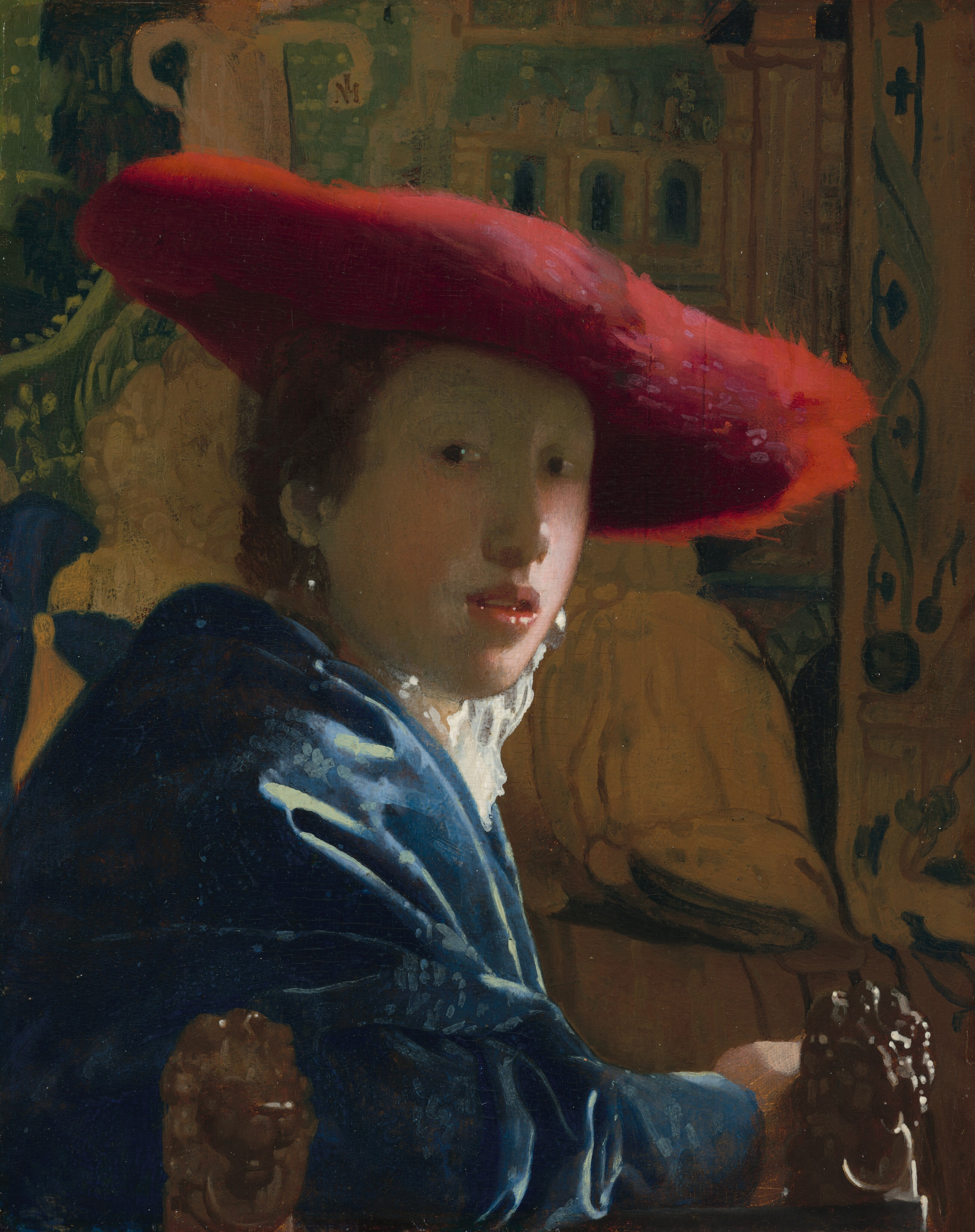
- Artist: Johannes Vermeer
- Year: c. 1669
- Medium: Oil on panel
- Movement: Dutch Golden Age painting
- Dimensions: 23.2 cm × 18.1 cm (9.1 in × 7.1 in)
- Location: National Gallery of Art, Washington, D.C.

Girl with a Red Hat is a small painting, signed by the Dutch painter Johannes Vermeer. It is seen as one of a number of Vermeer's tronies – depictions of models fancifully dressed that were not (as far as is known) intended to be portraits of specific, identifiable subjects. Whether Vermeer chose family members as models or found them elsewhere in Delft is irrelevant to the appreciation of his paintings. Its attribution to Vermeer – as it is on a (recycled) wood panel and not on canvas – has been a matter of controversy with scholars on both sides of the argument. However, in recent study carried out by the curators of National Gallery of Art certainty has been established on the authorship of the painting by Vermeer, a conclusion also supported by Dutch experts.

== Subject of the portrait ==
The portrait depicts a very young woman dressed in blue, wearing a collar that appears to be lace and a red hat. Her hair is up and she wears a pair of dangling earrings. She looks at the spectator as if she has just turned her head in the direction of a sound, a voice, that has captured her attention. Her mouth is ajar and her face, slightly pink, receives light from the right, which is unusual in the works of Johannes Vermeer.

However, after a study using the latest technology in preparation for a 2022 exhibition, titled Vermeer's Secrets it was ascertained that Vermeer began by painting the portrait of a man wearing a wide-brimmed hat.

== Authorship ==
According to the specialized newspaper The Art Newspaper, a multidisciplinary team came to the conclusion that the painting was without a doubt a Vermeer, who probably painted no more than 40 or 50 works over a 22-year career, of which only 35 are known.

== Provenance ==
The painting, supposedly executed c. 1669, may have been among those owned by Vermeer's patron, Pieter Claesz van Ruijven, and it may have been passed through inheritance to his wife, Maria de Knuijt, who died 1681; her daughter, Magdalena van Ruijven; and Magdalena's husband, Jacob Abrahamsz Dissius. It is thought to have been sold at an auction in Amsterdam on May 16, 1696 (probably no. 38, 39 or 40).

It was bought at a sale at the Hôtel de Bouillon, in Paris, on December 10, 1822, (no. 28.) by Baron Louis Marie Baptiste Atthalin for 200 French francs. After his death it came to his nephew and adopted son, Laurent Atthalin; by inheritance to Baron Gaston Laurent-Atthelin and by inheritance to his wife, Baroness Laurent-Atthelin. The painting was sold by M. Knoedler & Co., New York and London, in November 1925 to Andrew W. Mellon for $290,000, who deeded it on March 30, 1932, to The A. W. Mellon Educational and Charitable Trust in Pittsburgh (a holding-place for Mellon's pictures while the National Gallery of Art was being established). The trust gave it to the National Gallery of Art in 1937.

== Painting materials ==
The older pigment analysis by Herman Kuhn was supplemented by a more recent investigation. The red hat is painted in two layers: the lower layer consists of vermilion mixed with a black pigment, the upper layer is a madder lake glaze. Vermeer used a mixture of azurite and yellow ochre for the green areas and umber (umbra) for the browns in the wall.

== See also ==
- List of paintings by Johannes Vermeer
