= Pieter van Ruijven =

Dutch art patron and collector (1624–1678)

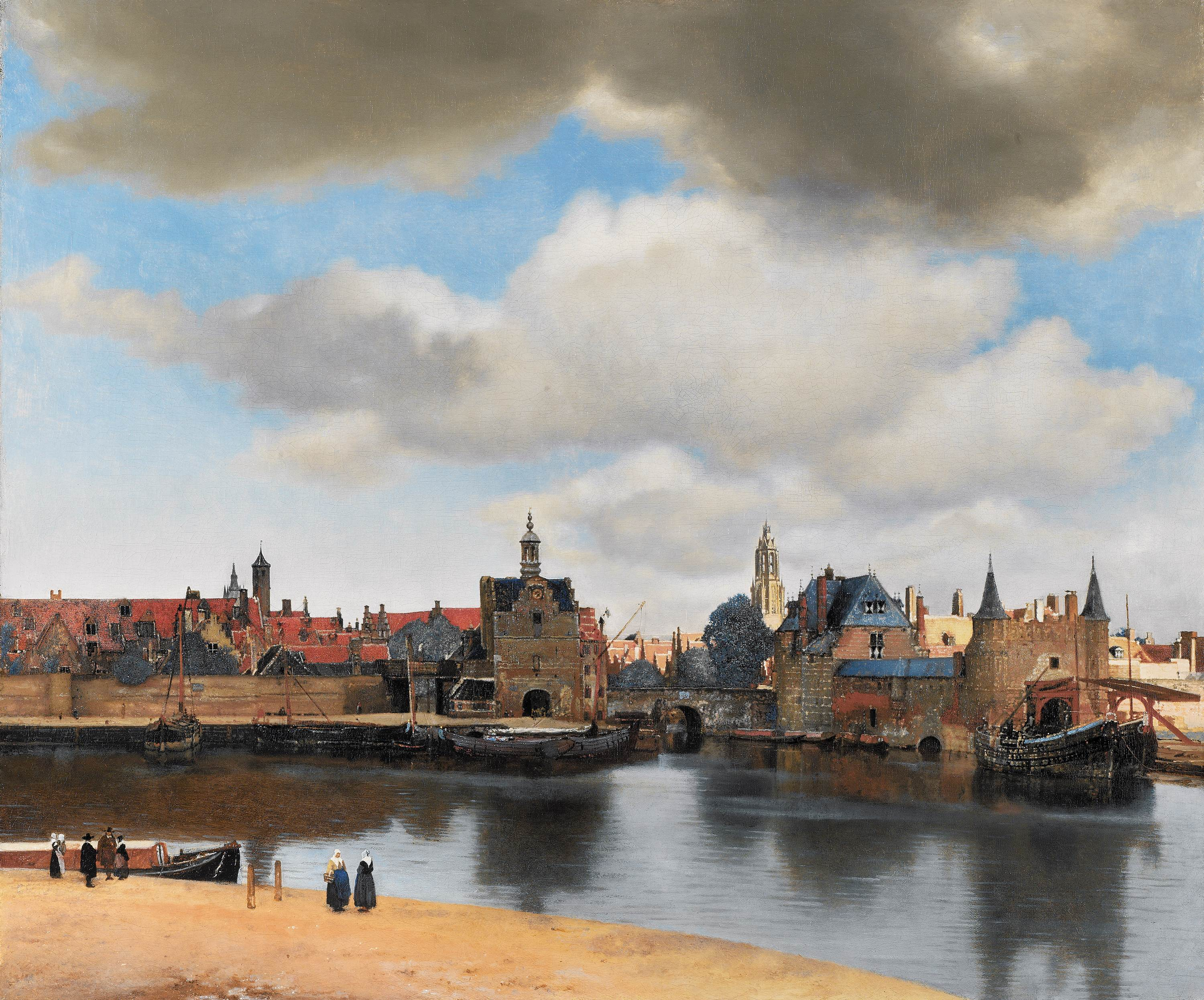
Johannes Vermeer, View of Delft (1660-61), oil on canvas, 96.5 × 117.5 cm; a painting once owned by Van Ruijven

Pieter Claeszoon van Ruijven (December 1624 – 7 August 1674) has been known as Johannes Vermeer's main patron for the better part of the artist's career, but in 2023 his wife Maria de Knuijt was identified by the curators of the 2023 exhibition of Vermeer's works at the Rijksmuseum, in Amsterdam as the main patron due to her long-standing and supportive relationship with the artist. He built a sizeable estate from inheritances he and his wife received and fruitful investments. In 1669, he became the Lord of Spalant when he purchased land owned by Willem, Baron van Renesse.

== Personal life ==
Van Ruijven was born in December 1624, the son of Niclaes Pietersz and Maria Graswinckel. His father was master of the Camer van Charitate in Delft (municipal charitable department) from 1623 to 1624 and the brewer at the Ox Brewery. The brewery failed in about 1650, after Niclaes Pietersz died. Pieter's brother was Johan (also Jan) van Ruijven, a notary.

Van Ruijven and his paternal family members were Remonstrants, and some were considered loyal to Oldenbarnevelt. As a result, they were unable to seek the most important municipal positions. Van Ruijven was related to artist Pieter Jansz van Ruyven. Van Ruiven was related to artists of the Delff family through the marriage of Christina Delff to his cousin Jan Hermansz. van Ruijven. The artists include Christina's brother Jacob Willemsz Delff and her nephew Willem Jacobsz Delff, an engraver. Jacob Delff's father-in-law was Michiel Jansz. van Mierevelt. He was also related to the Graswinckels and Van Santens, Dutch noble families.

Van Ruijven married Maria Simonsdr de Knuijt in August 1653. De Knuijt was a Dutch Reformed Protestant. Van Ruijven was not known to have a profession, but de Knuijt and van Ruijven were well-off and had two homes in Delft. From 1668 to 1674, Van Ruijven was master of the Camer van Charitate, which provided relief to the poor and served as a diaconate for Delft. His fortune was made through wise investments of the riches they inherited, including investment in the Dutch East India Company. De Knuijt brought most of the wealth into the marriage. Van Ruijven became the Lord of Spalant when he purchased the land from Willem, Baron of Renesse on 11 April 1669. He used his new-found title when he witnessed the testament of Vermeer's sister. The van Ruijven family, who lived off the Oude Canal in Delft, were members of the Arminian party in the Dutch Reformed Church. The also lived off Voorstraet and in The Hague.

Van Ruijven had a daughter, Magdalena van Ruijven, baptized at the Old Church of Delft on 12 October 1655. She married Jacob Dissius on 14 April 1680, and was generally known after that by her husband's surname. Baptism records at the Old Church identify two additional children of Van Ruijven and his wife, Maria baptized in 1657 and Simon in 1662. They are believed to have died young, since they were not identified as heirs to Maria and Pieter's fortune.

Pieter died and was buried on 7 August 1674. Maria died by 26 February 1681 when she was buried in Delft next to her husband at the Old Church. Their daughter Magdalena died on 16 June 1682 at the age of 27. She and her husband had no children. The van Ruijven estate was inherited by Jacob Dissius and his father Abraham Dissius. As stipulated in Magdalena's will, Abraham was to inherit half of the estate if her mother had died before her and Magdalena and Jacob did not have any children. This may have been because Jacob, of no means himself, married Magdalena, who was an heiress. Jacob may have been given the printing press his father Abraham owned to use as a dowry, and Abraham was compensated by receiving half of his son's inheritance. Besides the Vermeer paintings passed down through the family, Magdalena's estate included her legacy of a house in Voorstraet, the domain of Spalant, and interest-bearing obligations.

== Art collector ==
John Michael Montias identified van Ruijven as Vermeer's main patron, beginning in 1657 when van Ruijven loaned 200 guilders to the artist. There is no record of such a relationship. In 2023, his wife Maria de Knuijt was identified by the curators of the 2023 exhibition of Vermeer's works at the Rijksmuseum, in Amsterdam as the main patron due to her long-standing and supportive relationship with the artist. Maria de Knuijt included Vermeer, the only non-family member to be addressed, in her will of 1665. The will stated that he should have received 500 guilders. Regardless of whether he or his wife was the main patron, van Ruijven was a serious art collector who admired Vermeer. He owned paintings from other artists, like Emanuel de Witte and Simon de Vlieger, who were from Delft and created works of Dutch subjects.

== Popular culture ==
Van Ruijven is depicted as a predatory lecher in Tracy Chevalier's historical novel Girl with a Pearl Earring (1999), and in the 2003 film of the book, although there is no evidence of this.

== Bibliography ==
- Broos, Ben; Wheelock, Arthur K. Jr. (1996). Wheelock, Arthur K. (ed.). "Johannes Vermeer" (PDF). National Gallery of Art, Washington, D.C. and Royal Cabinet of Paintings Mauritshuis, The Hague. New Haven: Yale University Press and Netherlands: Waanders, Zwolle.
- Haks, Donald; Van der Sman, Marie Christine, eds. (1996). Dutch society in the age of Vermeer. The Hague: Hague Historical Museum and Zwolle : Waanders Publishers. ISBN 978-90-400-9823-9.
- Liedtke, Walter A. (2001). O'Neill, John P. (ed.). Vermeer and the Delft School. New York: The Metropolitan Museum of Art. ISBN 0-87099-973-7.
- Montias, John Michael (1987). "Vermeer's Clients and Patrons". The Art Bulletin. 69 (1): 68–76. doi:10.2307/3051083. ISSN 0004-3079. JSTOR 3051083. Including footnotes.
- Montias, John Michael (2018). Vermeer and His Milieu: A Web of Social History. Princeton University Press. ISBN 978-0-691-18859-1.
