= Ilya Ostroukhov =

Russian painter

- Илья Семёнович Остроухов
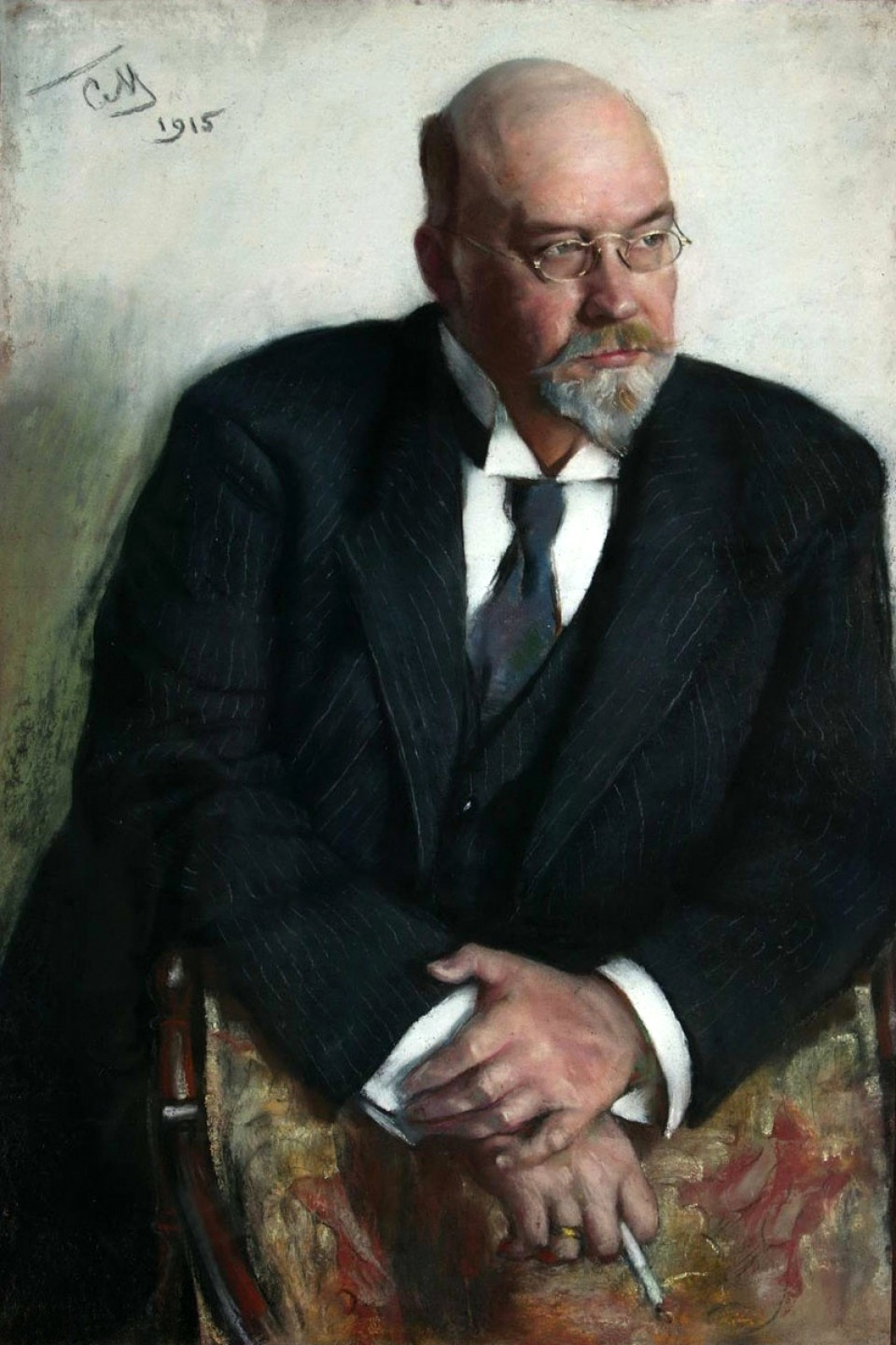
- Ilya Ostroukhov (1915): portrait by Sergey Malyutin.
- Born: July 20, 1858; Moscow, Russian Empire
- Died: July 8, 1929 (aged 70); Moscow, Soviet Union
- Resting place: Danilov Cemetery, Moscow
- Education: Academy of Commercial Sciences
- Known for: Landscape painting; Art collecting
- Awards: Legion of Honour

Ilya Semyonovich Ostroukhov (Russian: Илья́ Семёнович Остроу́хов; 20 July 1858, in Moscow – 8 July 1929, in Moscow) was a Russian landscape painter and art collector, associated with the Peredvizhniki.

== Biography ==
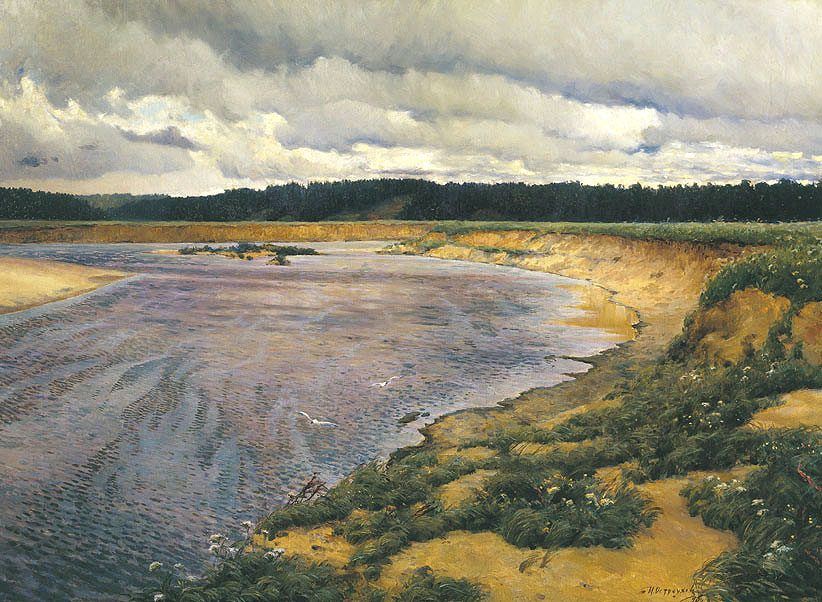
Siverko (a cold north wind); his most familiar painting (1890)

He came from a family of well-to-do merchants. In 1870, he enrolled at the "Moscow Academy of Practical Commercial Sciences". While there, he became interested in zoology and began a correspondence with Alfred Brehm. He also started an entomological collection that would later be donated to the University of Moscow, and wrote a short book called Angling for Fish (1877).

He did not take his first art lessons until 1880, when he developed the desire to become a painter after seeing an exhibition of landscape paintings staged by the Peredvizhniki. Concerned that he was too old to begin attending art school, he sought someone to give him private lessons. An old acquaintance introduced him to Alexander Kiselyov, who at that time was working at a private girls' school and tutoring.

The following year, he felt confident enough to study with Ilya Repin. That Christmas, he worked together with Victor Vasnetsov, designing and creating decorations for a performance at the home of Savva Mamontov. After that, he became a regular visitor to Abramtsevo, sketching the landscapes and architecture.

Meanwhile, he applied at the Imperial Academy of Arts, but was only allowed to audit classes. In the evenings he studied drawing at the Imperial Society for the Encouragement of the Arts and took more lessons from Repin. Through 1884, he also spent some time in the workshop of Pavel Chistyakov. In 1886, he was able to study with Vladimir Makovsky at the Moscow School of Painting, Sculpture and Architecture. That same year, he presented two paintings at the fourteenth exhibition of the Peredvizhniki and would exhibit with them regularly after that; becoming a member in 1891.

=== The Tretyakov Gallery ===
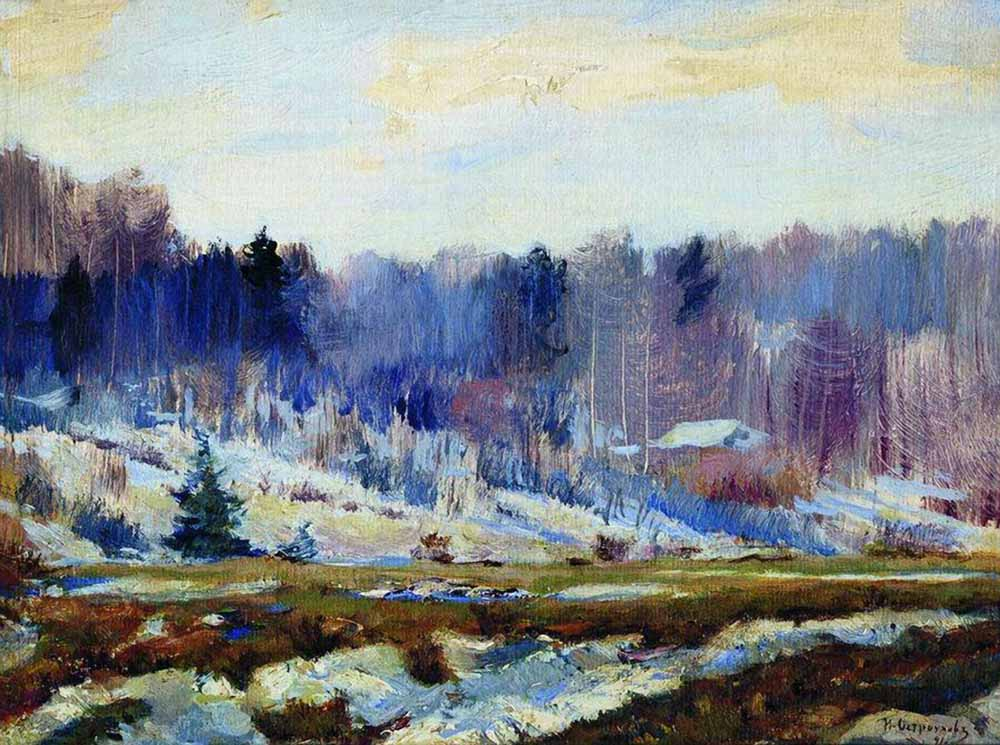
The Last Snow

He would also develop a close friendship with Pavel Tretyakov, who bought several of his early paintings. After Tretyakov's death in 1898, the Moscow City Duma chose Ostroukhov as one of the trustees for the Tretyakov Gallery. From 1899 to 1903, he served as de facto head of the board, then was removed for spending too much on acquisitions.

Apparently upset by the affair, he retired to a spa in the Vosges to recuperate. In 1905, after some contention, the Duma elected him chairman of the board. Everything went well until 1913, when a knife-wielding attacker slashed Ivan the Terrible and His Son Ivan, Repin's painting of Ivan the Terrible. This gave Ostroukhov's opponents a chance to attack him. He resigned and, by mutual agreement with the Duma, was replaced by Igor Grabar.

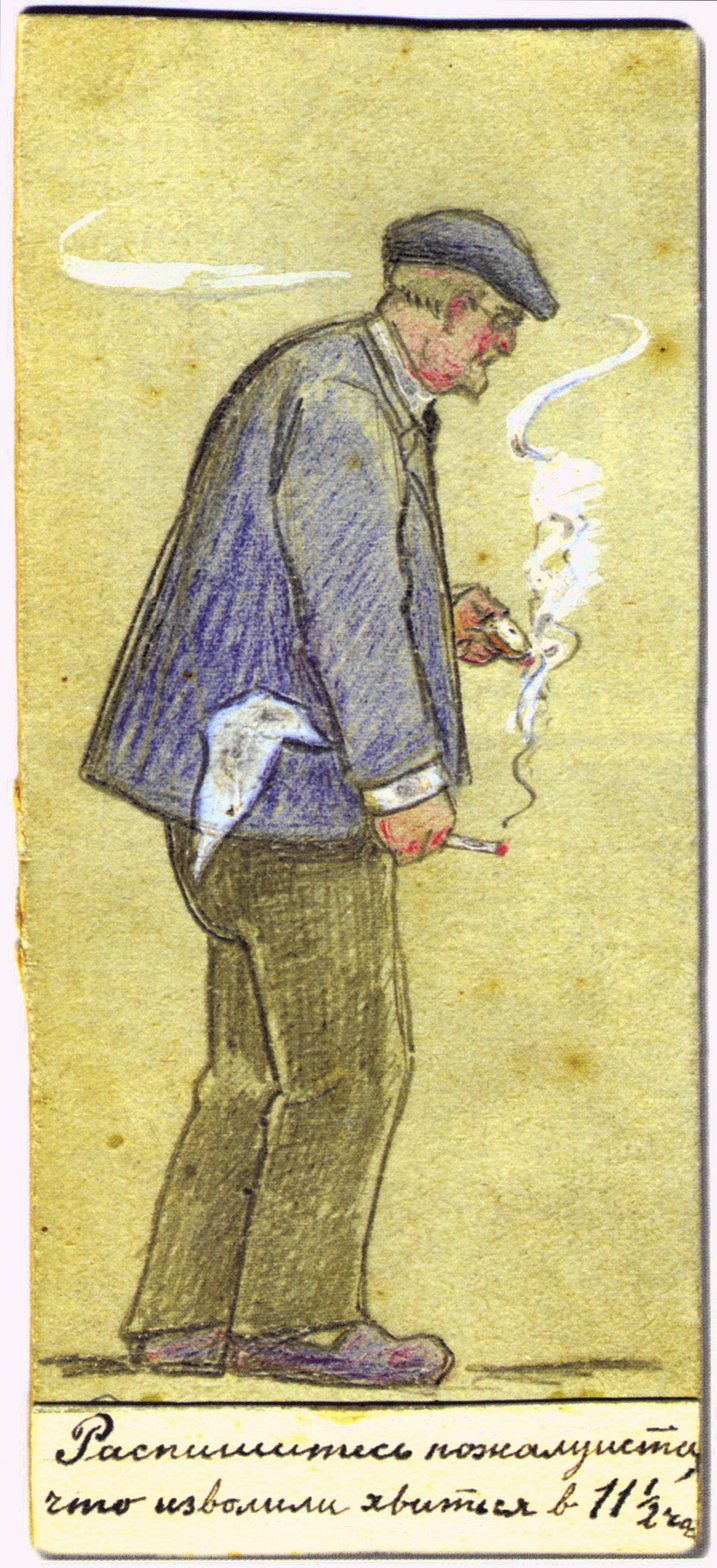
Ilya Ostroukhov by Ernst Lissner (1927).

During this period (which also included a stint as organizer of the Russian exhibition at the Exposition Universelle (1900) and election to the Imperial Academy in 1906) he had virtually given up painting. It was not until 1916, when he spent some time with friends in Crimea, that he began to sketch again. Two years later, he held his last full-scale exhibition with the Peredvizhniki.

=== Collector ===
In addition to his work with the Tretyakov Gallery, he was a notable collector in his own right; beginning in the 1890s after he married into the wealthy Botkin family of tea merchants and acquired a large house as a dowry. He accumulated over 300 paintings (including Medieval icons) and 500 drawings; mostly by Russian artists, but Degas, Manet, Renoir and Matisse were also represented. One of its highlights was The Allegory of Faith by Vermeer. He had a library of over 12,000 volumes as well; including a copy of the Divine Comedy from 1515 and a Decameron from 1757. In 1918, his collection was nationalized as a public museum and he was appointed curator for life.

By March 1929 when, as a former landlord, he found himself deprived of his voting rights, he was in very poor health and nearly blind. He died four months later. Shortly after, the museum was closed and his widow was limited to the use of two rooms in their home. She died in 1935. His collection was transferred to the Tretyakov Gallery. Later, the house was reopened as a branch of the "State Literary Museum".
