= Van Buyten =

Van Buyten is a surname that may refer to:

- Daniel Van Buyten (born 1978), Belgian football player
- Hendrick van Buyten (1632–1701), Dutch baker
