= The Girl with the Wine Glass =

1659–1660 painting by Johannes Vermeer

The Girl with the Wine Glass (A Lady and Two Gentlemen)
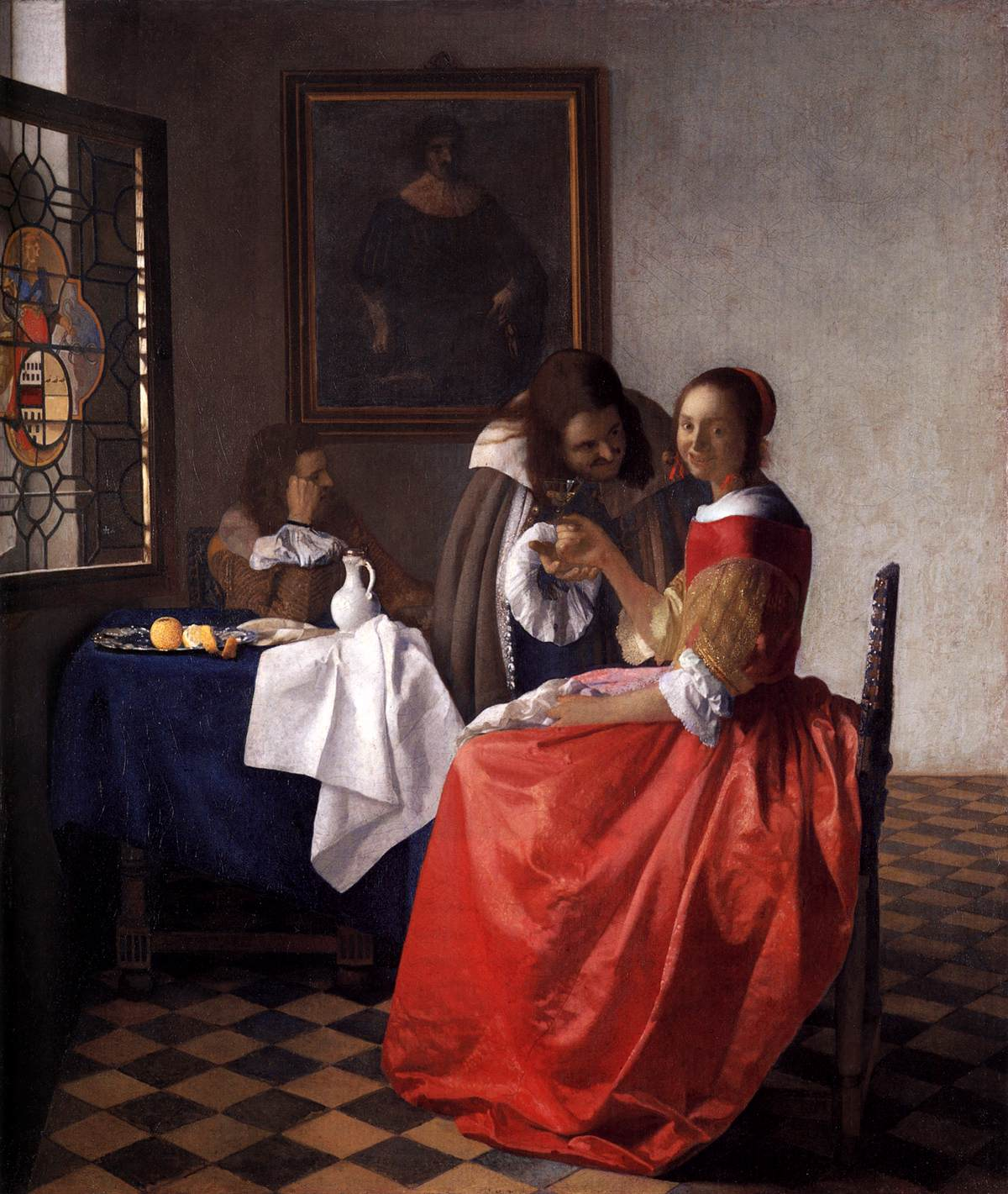
- The Girl with the Wine Glass (Dame en twee heren)
- Artist: Johannes Vermeer
- Year: c. 1659–1660
- Medium: oil on canvas
- Dimensions: 78 cm × 67.5 cm (31 in × 26.6 in)
- Location: Herzog Anton Ulrich Museum; Braunschweig

The Girl with the Wine Glass (Dame en twee heren) is an oil-on-canvas painting of the Dutch Golden Age by Johannes Vermeer, created c. 1659–1660, now in the Herzog Anton Ulrich Museum, in Braunschweig.

== Painting materials ==
The pigment analysis done by Hermann Kühn shows Vermeer's use of the expensive natural ultramarine in the tablecloth, lead-tin-yellow in the oranges on the table and madder lake and vermilion in the skirt of the woman.

== See also ==
- List of paintings by Johannes Vermeer
