= Balthasar de Monconys =

French diplomat

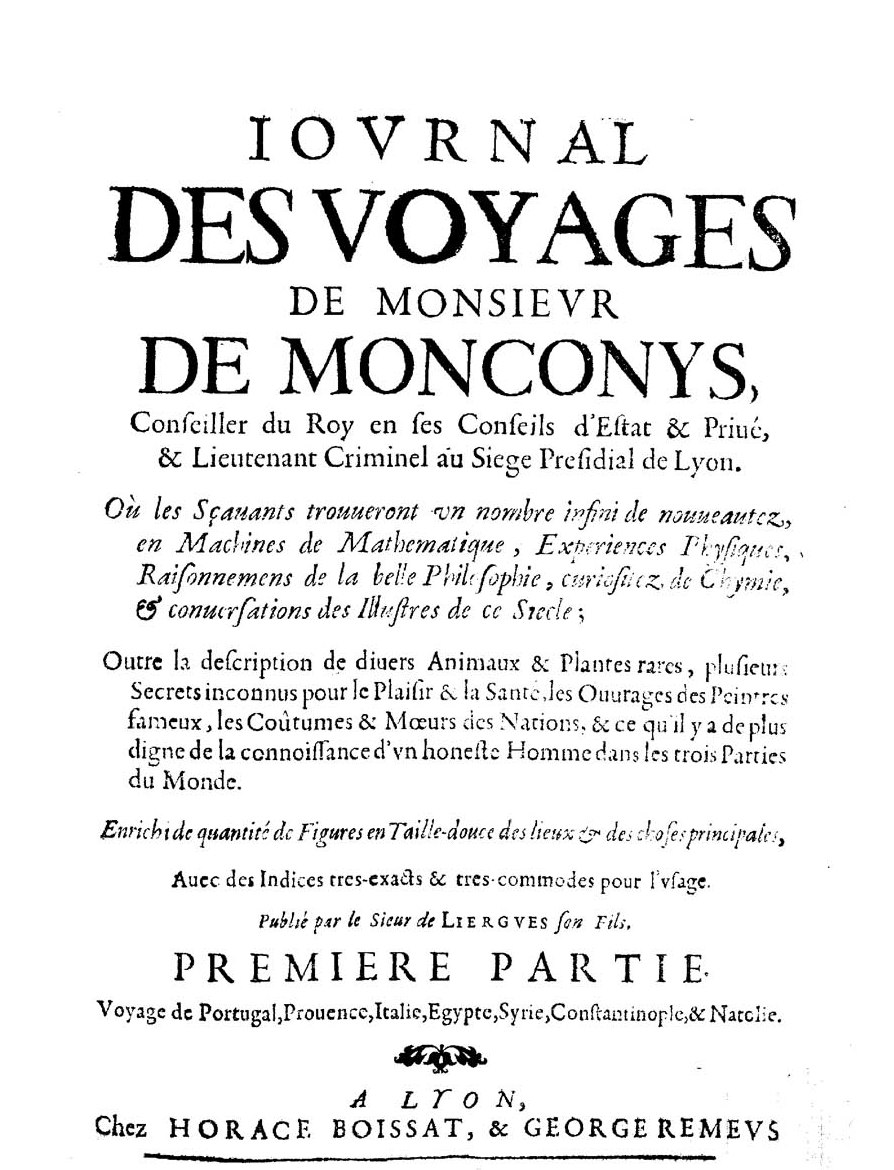
Journal des voyages. Voyage de Portugal, Provence, Italie, Egypte, Syrie, Constantinople et Natolie, 1665

Balthasar de Monconys (1611–1665) was a French traveller, diplomat, physicist and magistrate, who left a diary, which was published by his son as Journal des voyages de Monsieur de Monconys, Conseiller du Roy en ses Conseils d’Estat & Privé, & Lieutenant Criminel au Siège Presidial de Lyon, 2 vols., Lyon, 1665–1666.

Monconys was brought up in Lyon by the Jesuits and had an interest in the Jesuit missions in what was considered at the time to be infidel territory. He travelled to Portugal, England, Germany, Italy, the Netherlands and the Middle East (visiting Baalbek in 1647). Monconys first visited Delft in search of a hidden church. His second visit, in August 1663, was to meet an artist with a growing reputation. He was the only person, besides Pieter Teding van Berckhout, who met Vermeer and wrote down an eyewitness account of Vermeer's paintings, during the artist's lifetime. Vermeer had no paintings to show Monconys and his companion, a clergyman from The Hague, so they were directed to the local baker Hendrick van Buyten, who possessed one of the artist's paintings. Monconys also visited Johannes Sibertus Kuffler in the same year.

== Works ==
- Monconys, Balthasar de (1665). Journal des voyages. 1, Voyage de Portugal, Provence, Italie, Egypte, Syrie, Constantinople et Natolie (in French). Horace Boissat & George Remeus.
- Monconys, Balthasar de (1666). Journal des voyages. 2, Voyage d'Angleterre, Pais-Bas, Allemagne et Italie (in French). Horace Boissat & George Remeus.
- Monconys, Balthasar de (1666). Journal des voyages. 3, Voyage d'Espagne, mort de sultan Hibrahim, lettres sçauantes, algebre, vers et secrets (in French). Horace Boissat & George Remeus.
