= The Allegory of Faith =

Painting by Johannes Vermeer

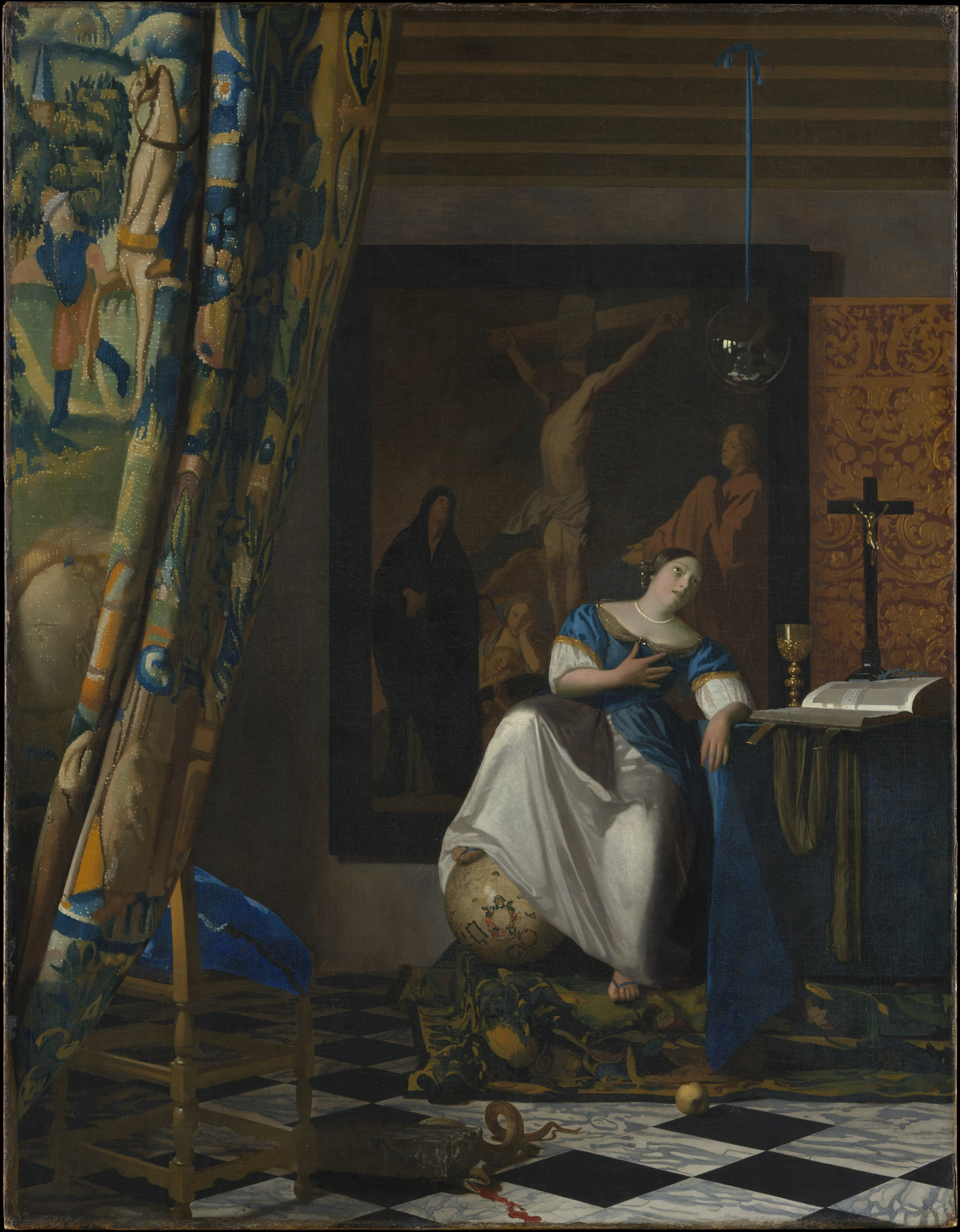
- Artist: Johannes Vermeer
- Year: c. 1670–1672
- Medium: Oil on canvas
- Dimensions: 114.3 cm × 88.9 cm (45.0 in × 35.0 in)
- Location: Metropolitan Museum of Art, New York
- Accession: 32.100.18

The Allegory of Faith, also known as The Allegory of the Catholic Faith, is a Dutch Golden Age painting by Johannes Vermeer from about 1670–1672. It has been in the Metropolitan Museum of Art in New York since 1931.

This and The Art of Painting are his only works that fall under the category of history painting in the contemporary hierarchy of genres, though they still have his typical composition of one or two figures in a domestic interior. Both share several features: the perspective is almost the same, and there is a multicolor tapestry at the left of each painting, pulled to the left to reveal the scene. The Art of Painting also uses symbolism from Cesare Ripa of Clio, muse of history. Vermeer's Love Letter uses a similar gilt panel. The Allegory and The Art of Painting differ markedly in style and purpose from Vermeer's other works.

== Description ==
The painting depicts a woman in a fine white and blue satin dress with gold trimmings. She sits on a platform a step higher than the black and white marble floor, her right foot on a terrestrial globe and her right hand on her heart as she looks up, adoringly, at a glass sphere hung from the ceiling by a blue ribbon. Her left arm rests on the edge of a table which holds a golden chalice, a large book, and a dark-wood crucifix. Behind the crucifix is a gilt-leather panel screen. Beneath the book is a long piece of cloth, possibly a priest's stole. Resting on top of the book is a crown of thorns. All of these items are on the platform, which is covered by a green and yellow rug, the edge of which is on the floor. At the bottom of the picture, nearer the viewer, is an apple, and nearer still a snake which has been squashed by a cornerstone. On the dim, far wall behind the woman, a large painting of Christ's crucifixion is hung. To the viewer's left is a multicolored tapestry, pulled back at the bottom and seemingly the closest thing in the painting to the viewer. A chair with a blue cloth on it is immediately beneath and behind the tapestry and to the left of the snake and cornerstone.

== Iconography ==
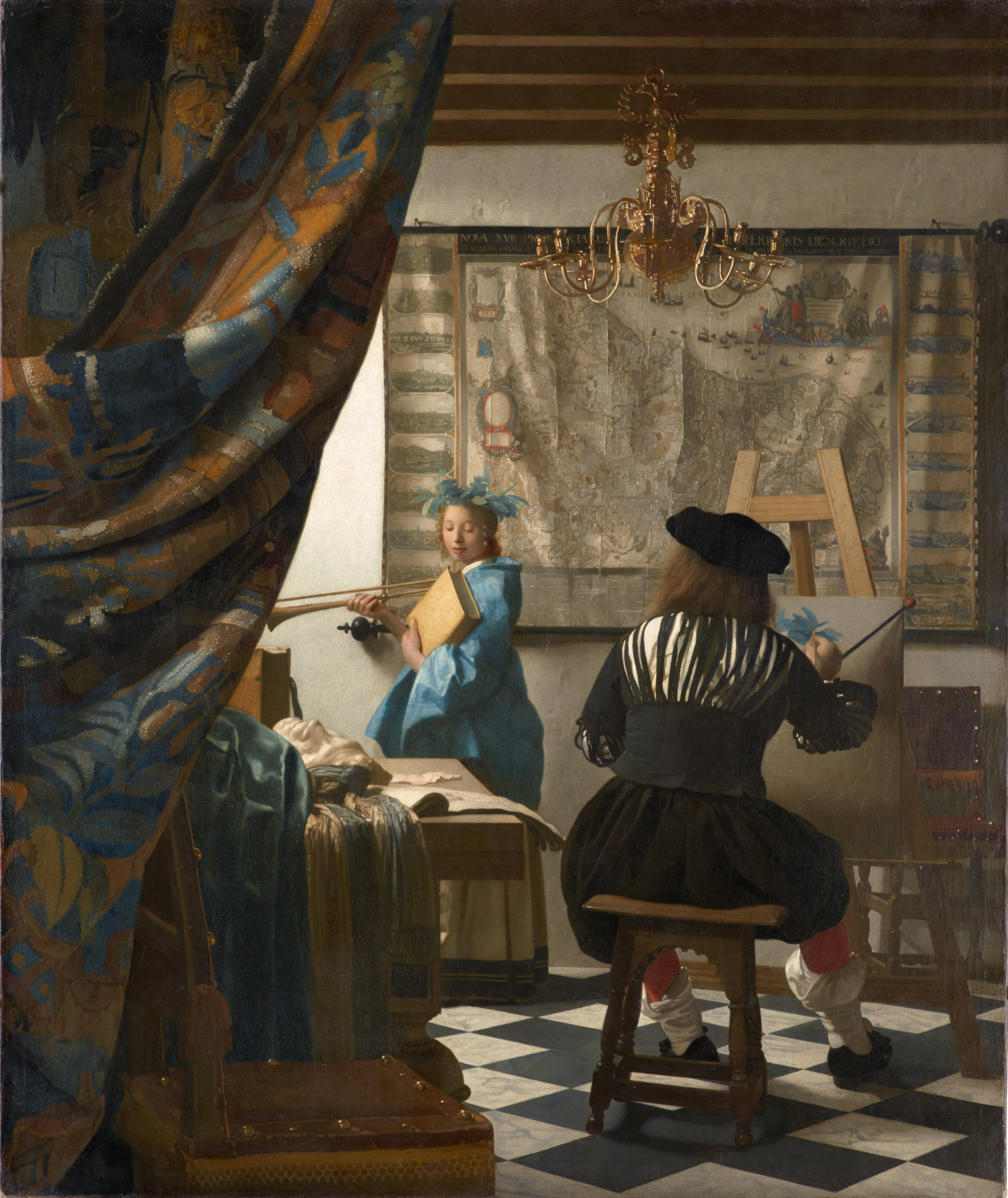
Vermeer's Art of Painting

=== From Cesare Ripa's Iconologia ===
Vermeer's iconography in the painting is largely taken from Cesare Ripa's Iconologia, an emblem book (a collection of allegorical illustrations with accompanying morals or poems on a moral theme) which had been translated into Dutch in 1644 by D. P. Pers. The artist used various symbols that Ripa described and illustrated in his book, along with symbols taken from other books and traditions. Two of the four allegorical figures of Faith ("Fede. Geloof" and "Fede Catholica. Catholijck of algemeen Geloof") given in Ripa's book provide many of the symbols in the painting, including the color of the woman's clothing, her hand gesture, and the presence of the crushed snake and the apple.

In his book, Ripa states that Faith is the most important of the virtues. One image in the book shows her as a woman, dressed in white (signifying light and purity) and blue (which relates to heaven, as Ripa states in another text). Faith's hand on her breast symbolizes that the virtue rests in her heart. Christ is represented in the cornerstone crushing the snake (a symbol of the Devil), and the apple (the fruit Eve gave to Adam) represents original sin, which in Christian doctrine required the sacrifice of the Saviour. Ripa describes Faith as "having the world under her feet", and Vermeer used the symbol quite literally, showing a globe of the earth under the woman's right foot. (The globe, with its distinctive cartouche (decorative label) has been identified as one made by Hendrick Hondius).

=== From other sources ===
The crucifix, painting of the Crucifixion and the glass orb are not mentioned by Ripa, and Vermeer changed some of the iconography that Ripa gave: Instead of Ripa's suggestion that Faith hold the chalice and rest her hand on a book, Vermeer put them on the table next to her. According to Arthur K. Wheelock Jr., a University of Maryland academic and curator of a Vermeer exhibit at the National Gallery of Art in Washington, this is "an assemblage that gives the image a Eucharistic character not found in the text." By putting the golden chalice against the dark background of the painting's frame and the dark crucifix against the gilt-leather backdrop, the elements are given a greater prominence in the painting. Wheelock, citing his fellow academic at the University of Maryland, Quint Gregory, believes the slight overlapping of the chalice and the gold backdrop of the crucifix "may symbolically suggest the essential role of the Eucharist in bridging the physical and spiritual realms", a very Catholic idea. Selena Cant calls the fact that the book, chalice and crucifix together represent the Catholic Mass.

The pose of the woman (hand on heart and eyes raised) is similar to Ripa's image of Theology. The pose was uncommon in Dutch art, but Vermeer was considered an expert in Italian painting, in which the image was often used (especially those of Guido Reni [1575–1642], whose works were then owned in Holland). Wheelock believes the large book, which has a metal clasp, is a Bible, but the Metropolitan Museum of Art states on its website that the volume may be the Catholic Missale Romanum.

The painting's iconography is not only Catholic, but some believe it is strongly influenced by Jesuit ideas. Departing from Ripa's allusion to the story of Abraham and Isaac (an Old Testament story said to prefigure the faithful sacrifice of Christ on the Cross), Vermeer instead uses an image of the Crucifixion itself — an image dear to the Jesuits. Vermeer used Crucifixion, a painting from about 1620 by Jacob Jordaens (1593–1678). The painter may have owned a copy of the painting. (This may be "the large painting representing Christ on the Cross" described in an inventory of his household at his death. Two other items in the inventory may be in this painting: the "gold-tooled leather on the wall" of his home's kitchen, and an "ebony wood crucifix").

Another Jesuit influence in the painting is said to be the glass orb on which the woman sets her eyes. According to Eddy De Johgh, Vermeer appears to have taken it from a 1636 emblem book by the Jesuit Willem Hesius, Emblemata sacra de fide, spe, charitate. In the emblem, "Capit Quod Non Capit", a winged boy, a symbol of the soul, is shown holding a sphere reflecting a nearby cross and the sun. In a poem accompanying the emblem, Hesius states that the sphere's ability to reflect the world is similar to the mind's ability to believe in God. Selena Cant has written that the sphere is "symbol of the human mind and its capacity both to reflect and to contain infinity."

The woman's pearl necklace probably relates to pearls as ancient symbols of virginity, according to Cant. There is no source for the light on her dress, perhaps indicating that she is lit by an inner illumination — a strong indication to the viewer that she is not to be considered an individual, but a symbol, according to Walter Liedtke.

== Reception ==
Many art historians have considered the painting one of Vermeer's less successful works. Cant, for instance, calls it "harder, more brittle, less convincing. Faith herself appears uncomfortable: finely dressed, she appears too worldly to be a spiritual symbol, too solid to appear transported, the intimacy too forced and her expression too artificial."

According to Wheelock, "[T]he iconographic demands of this subject strained the credibility of his realistic approach. While essential for the painting's symbolic content, the ecstatic pose of the woman and the crushed snake seem incongruous within this Dutch setting." Walter Liedtke objected to Wheelock's point by asserting that the artist took a very realistic approach primarily in depicting the terrestrial globe and reflections in the glass sphere. Instead, according to Liedtke, the painting is best compared to contemporary Dutch paintings illustrating abstract concepts, including Adriaen Hanneman's Allegory of the Peace (1664; still in situ at the Eerste Kamer in the Binnenhof), a histrionic picture showing how reticent Vermeer was in this work; and Karel Dujardin's Allegory of the Immortal Fame of Art Vanquishing Time and Envy (1675; Historisches Museum, Bamberg); Gabriel Metsu's The Triumph of Justice (late 1650s; Mauritshuis, The Hague); Adriaen van de Velde's The Annunciation (1667; Rijksmuseum, Amsterdam)as well as works by Van Honthorst and early works of De Lairesse.

== Provenance ==
Vermeer's imaginative use of symbolism in the painting indicates to Wheelock that the painter was not given specific instructions on the allegory but chose the various items himself. The original owner is unknown but may have been a Catholic in Delft, possibly the Jesuits in the city. The Metropolitan Museum of Art website states, "This late work was surely commissioned, probably by a patron who was learned as well as devout."

The painting was one of those apparently not among the 21 works by the artist collection of Vermeer's main patron, Pieter Claesz van Ruijven (1624–1674), and auctioned off in the Dissius sale of 1696. Its first known owner was Herman Stoffelsz van Swoll (1632–1698), a postmaster and a Protestant. That Swoll was familiar with collecting art is indicated by the fact that the best man at his wedding in 1656 was a famous collector, Gerrit Reynst. The year after Swoll's death, in 1699, the painting was auctioned off in Amsterdam along with other works in Swoll's collection (which included Italian works). The sale catalogue described the work as "A sitting Woman with deep meanings, depicting the New Testament", and also stated, "powerfully and glowingly painted". After spending time in an unknown collection, the painting (described as "depicting the New Testament") was auctioned off in 1718, again in Amsterdam. It was auctioned again in 1735 (described as "artfully and minutely painted"), and in the Ietswaart sale of 1749 (described as "as good as Eglon van der Neer"). The mixed fortunes of Vermeer's reputation in the 18th century can be seen in the prices paid for the painting at these various auctions: f 400 in 1699; f500 in 1718; f53 in 1735; f70 in 1749).

By the early 19th century the painting apparently had found its way to Austria, where it was depicted in the background of Portrait of a Cartographer and His Wife by Ferdinand Georg Waldmüller in 1824 (now in Westfälisches Landesmuseum, Münster). Atlases depicted in this painting contain maps primarily of Vorarlberg and Tirol at the western end of Austria, so perhaps the painting was in that area, according to Wheelock. At the end of the century, the painting (at that time mistakenly attributed to Eglon van der Neer) was part of the collection of Ilya Ostroukhov (and later Dmitry Shchukin) in Moscow, making it the fourth Vermeer owned by Russians at that time. In 1899 it was put up for sale by a dealer, Wächtler, in Berlin. That year Abraham Bredius bought it for about DM 700. A Dutch newspaper at the time praised Bredius for the purchase: "With this acquisition of the new Delft Vermeer, the New Testament, as an Eglon van der Neer, Dr. Bredius has once again found a bargain with his perspicacious eye." Bredius then loaned the work to the Mauritshuis, where it remained for the next 24 years, until 1923 when Bredius gave it to the Museum Boijmans Van Beuningen in Rotterdam for a long-term loan.

Bredius disliked the work, calling it (in 1907) "a large but unpleasant Vermeer". In 1928, he sold it through the dealer Kleinberger to Michael Friedsam in New York, who bequeathed it in 1931 as part of the Friedsam Collection to the Metropolitan Museum of Art, where it has remained.

== Exhibitions ==
The painting has been loaned by The Met to a number of exhibitions that included multiple Vermeers being brought together from different museums. Amongst these were:

- "Vermeer. Il secolo d'oro dell'arte olandese" at le Scuderie del Quirinale in Rome, which opened on September 27, 2012 and ran through January 20, 2013
- "Rembrandt and the Dutch Golden Age" at the Museum of Fine Arts, Budapest, which opened on October 30, 2014 and ran through February 15, 2015
- "Vermeer et les maîtres de la peinture de genre" at the Louvre in Paris, which opened on February 22, 2017 and ran through May 22, 2017 (painting was not listed in exhibit catalogue)

== See also ==
- List of paintings by Johannes Vermeer
