= Hendrick van Buyten =

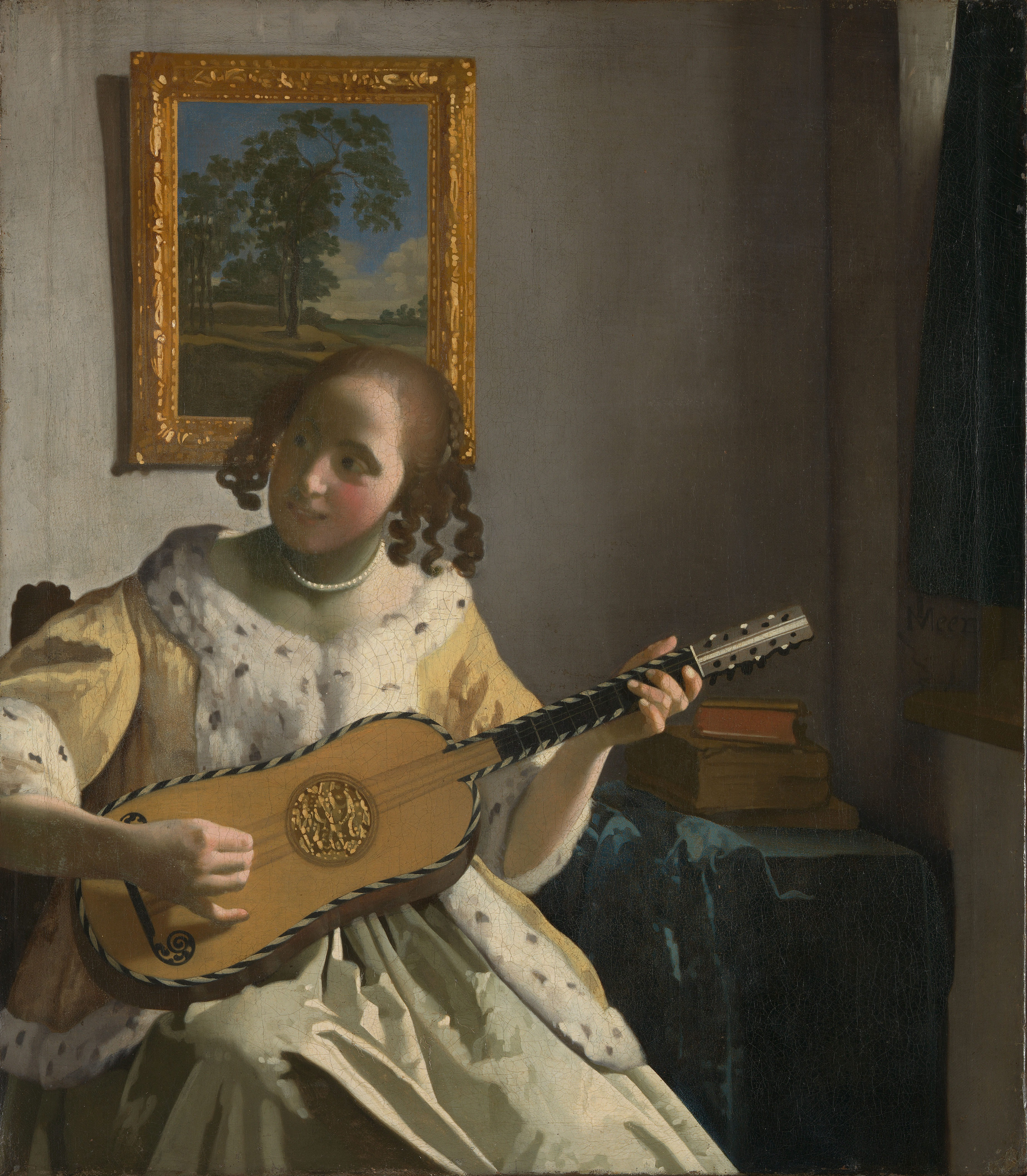
The guitar player Kenwood House, English Heritage

Hendrick van Buyten (1632 - July 1701) was a baker in Delft. He is famous because of his connection to Johannes Vermeer. In August 1663 he owned a painting by Vermeer when he was visited by Balthasar de Monconys. Van Buyten told the diplomat, accompanied by two friends, he had paid 600 guilder for the painting. Monconys opined that he would have thought he had overpaid for it had he bought it for sixty guilders.

In a disposition of January 1676, a month and a half after Vermeer's death, Catharina Bolnes appeared before a notary to acknowledge that she had sold and transferred two paintings by her late husband to Van Buyten. Catharina further declared that she had been paid 617 guilders for the two paintings, which she owed Van Buyten for bread delivered. He would return the paintings, a person playing on a cittern and another representing two persons one of whom is sitting writing a letter if she paid all her debts. Catharina had persistently urged him to. She had over twelve years to refund the main part of the debt at fifty guilders per year, and she did not even have to pay interest. Van Buyten must have delivered a great deal of bread to accumulate a total credit of over 726 guilders.

Van Buyten was married to Machtelt van Asson and in 1683 to Adriana Waelpot. If he earned more than 600 guilders a year, he belonged to the richest people in Holland, where a guilder a day was seen as a very good salary.
