= Johannes Vermeer =

Dutch painter (1632–1675)

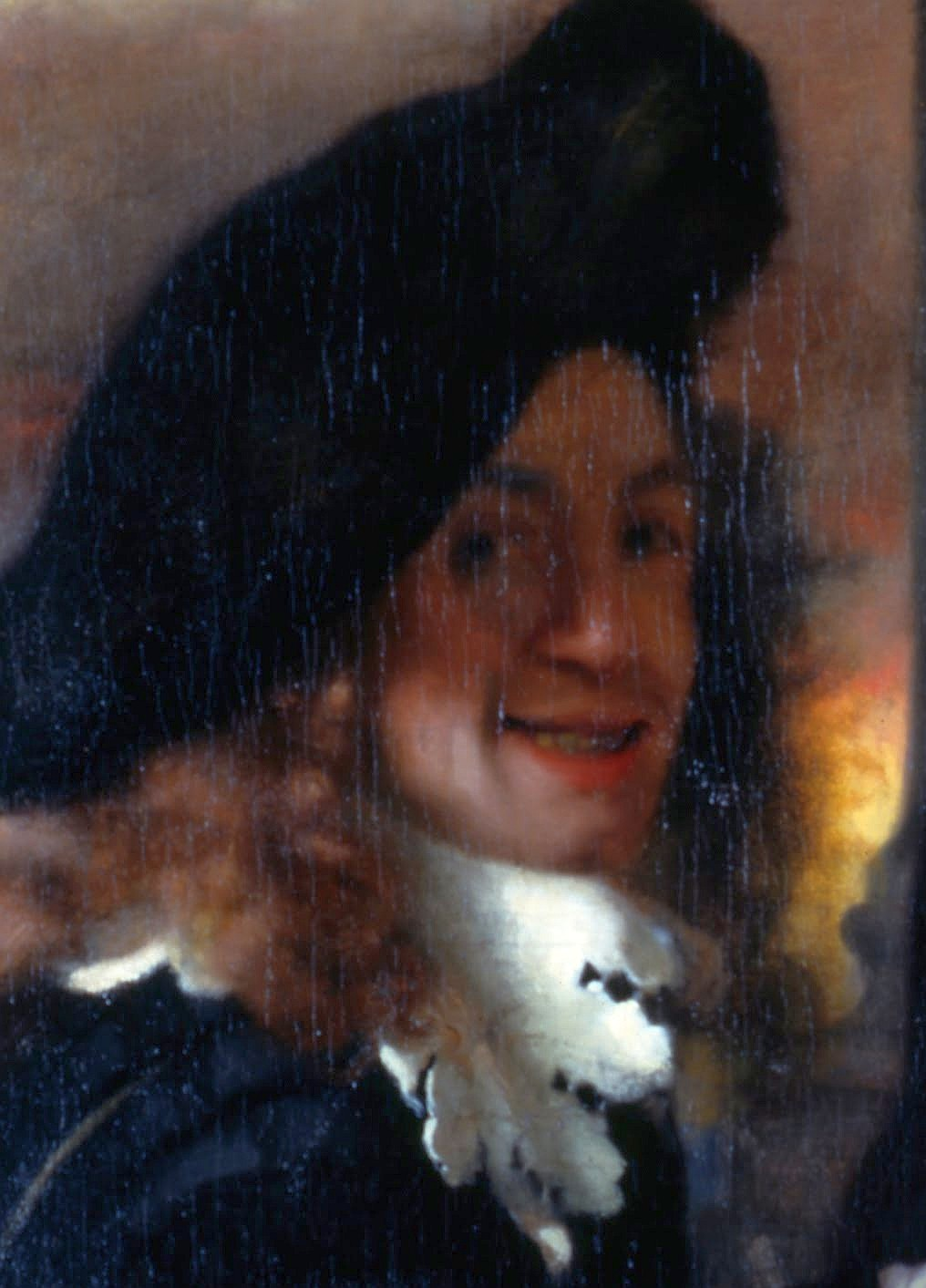
- Detail of the painting The Procuress (c. 1656), believed to be a self-portrait by Vermeer
- Born: Delft, Dutch Republic
- Baptized: 31 October 1632
- Died: 15 December 1675 (aged 43); Delft, Dutch Republic
- Known for: Painting
- Notable work: 34 works universally attributed
- Movement: Dutch Golden Age; Baroque
- Spouse: Catharina Bolnes

Johannes Vermeer (/vərˈmɪər, vərˈmɛər/ vər-MEER, vər-MAIR, Dutch: [joːˈɦɑnəs fərˈmeːr]; see below; also known as Jan Vermeer; October 1632 – 15 December 1675) was a Dutch painter who specialized in domestic interior scenes of middle-class life. He is considered one of the greatest painters of the Dutch Golden Age. During his lifetime, he was a moderately successful provincial genre painter, recognized in Delft and The Hague. He produced relatively few paintings, primarily earning his living as an art dealer. He was not wealthy; at his death, his wife was left in debt.

Vermeer worked slowly and with great care, and frequently used very expensive pigments. He is particularly renowned for making masterful use of light in his work. "Almost all his paintings", Hans Koningsberger wrote, "are apparently set in two smallish rooms in his house in Delft; they show the same furniture and decorations in various arrangements and they often portray the same people, mostly women."

The modest celebrity he enjoyed during his life gave way to obscurity after his death. He was barely mentioned in Arnold Houbraken's major source book on 17th-century Dutch painting (Grand Theatre of Dutch Painters and Women Artists, published 1718) and, as a result, was omitted from subsequent surveys of Dutch art for nearly two centuries. (Note: Vermeer was largely unknown to the general public, but his reputation was not totally eclipsed after his death: "While it is true that he did not achieve widespread fame until the 19th century, his work had always been valued and admired by well-informed connoisseurs.") In the 19th century, Vermeer was rediscovered by Gustav Friedrich Waagen and Théophile Thoré-Bürger, who published an essay attributing 66 works to him, although only 34 paintings are universally attributed to him today. Since that time, Vermeer's reputation has grown enormously.

== Pronunciation of name ==
In Dutch, Vermeer is pronounced [vərˈmeːr], and Johannes Vermeer as [joːˈɦɑnəs fərˈmeːr], with /v/ assimilating to the preceding voiceless /s/ as [f].The usual English pronunciation is /vərˈmɪər/ vər-MEER, with /vɜːrˈmɪər/ vur-MEER, with a long first vowel, occurring in the UK. /vərˈmɛər/ vər-MAIR is also documented. Another pronunciation, /vɛərˈmɪər/ vair-MEER, is attested from the UK.

== Life ==
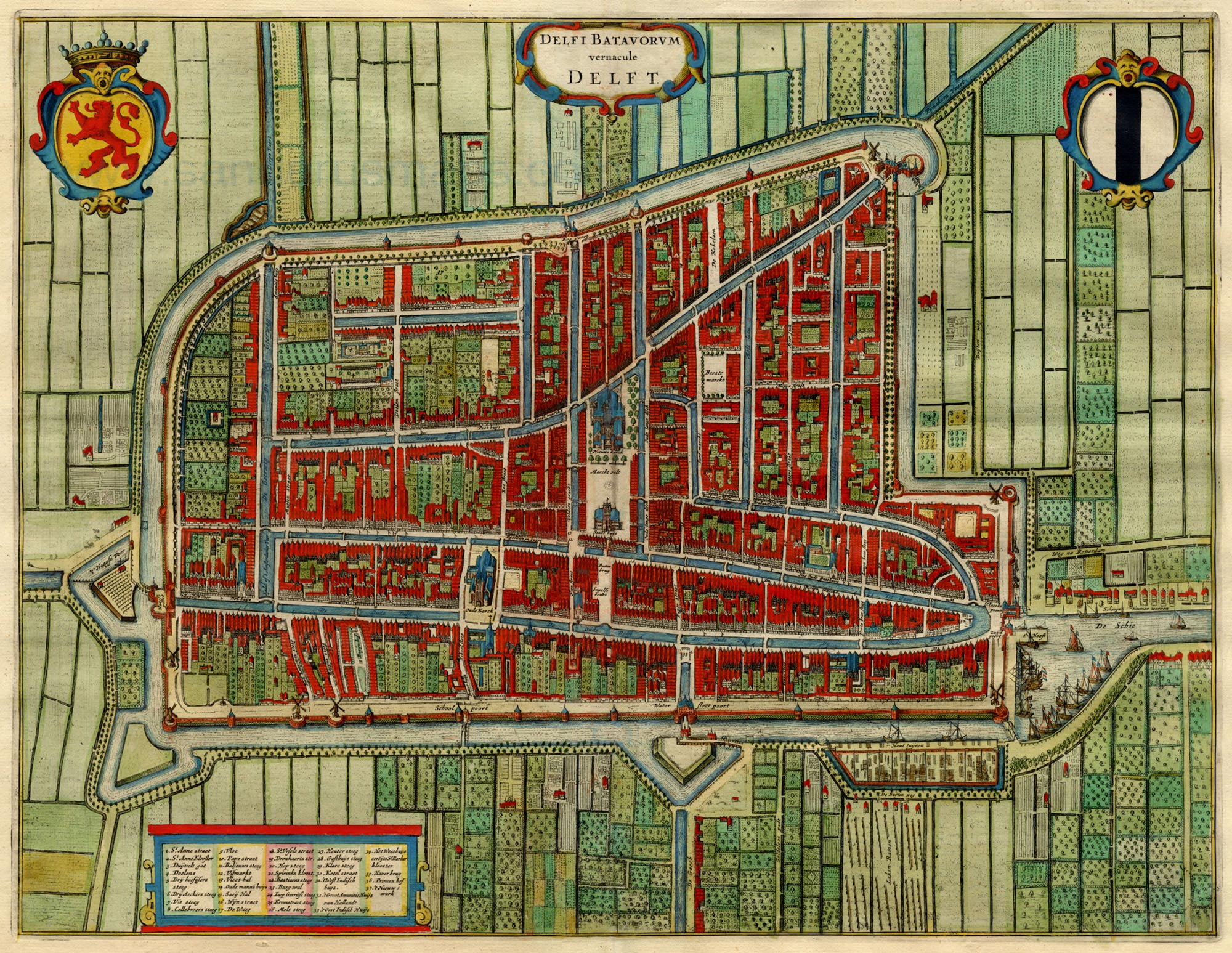
Delft in 1649, by cartographer Willem Blaeu

The Jesuit Church on the Oude Langendijk in Delft, c. 1730, brush in gray ink, by Abraham Rademaker, coll. Stadsarchief Delft

Relatively little was known about Vermeer's life until recently. He seems to have been devoted exclusively to his art, living out his life in the city of Delft. Until the 19th century, the only sources of information were a few registers, official documents, and comments by other artists; for this reason, Thoré-Bürger named him "The Sphinx of Delft". John Michael Montias added details on the family from the city archives of Delft in his Artists and Artisans in Delft: A Socio-Economic Study of the Seventeenth Century (1982).

=== Youth and background ===
Johannes Vermeer was baptized within the Reformed Church on 31 October 1632. (Note: Vermeer was baptized as Joannis. Jan was the most popular version of the name among Calvinists. Joannis was a Latinazied form of Jan, which was preferred by Roman Catholics and upper-middle class Protestants. However, Vermeer was born into a lower-middle class family. Still, according to Montias, it is unlikely that his parents were Catholics "at this time [the time of Vermeer's baptism]," seeing that they "baptized him in the established church." Throughout his life, Vermeer never used the name Jan. Nevertheless, "most Dutch authors, in the century since his rediscovery, have dubbed him Jan, perhaps unconsciously to bring him closer to the mainstream of Calvinist culture.") His Flemish mother, Digna Baltens (c. 1596–1670), (Note: His mother was born in Antwerp. When she married Vermeer's father in 1615, she claimed to be twenty years old, but she may have "exaggerated her age by a year or so." Digna's parents were married in Antwerp in 1596.) was from Antwerp. Digna's father, Balthasar Geerts, or Gerrits (born in Antwerp in or around 1573), was a highly skilled metalworker, clockmaker, and coin-die cutter. A craftsman in these skills held a high social and economic status, and belonged to a highly educated elite of precision artists and mechanics. At this time, cities like Antwerp and Mechelen in Flanders were central hubs for merchants, refugees, and religious dissidents from southern Europe. Antwerp was Europe's leading global trade center, which created a unique environment for cross-fertilization between science, art, and industry. Gerrits was later arrested in Holland for counterfeiting. The family's movement from Antwerp to Amsterdam and ultimately to Delft coincides with the Flemish exodus of artisans and merchants who fled religious persecution and economic collapse in the south during the Eighty Years' War. Following the fall of Antwerp to Spanish forces in 1585, Protestants, Marranos (hidden Jews or Conversos), and Moriscos (hidden Muslims) faced intense religious persecution. The city had previously been looted and burned in 1567 by Spanish soldiers, who killed thousands of residents. Philip II established the Council of Troubles (dubbed the "Blood Council"), to suppress Protestantism and political unrest. This sparked a massive wave of migration where over half of Antwerp's population—including thousands of highly skilled artisans, weavers, merchants, and intellectuals—fled to the Northern Netherlands.The route through Antwerp, Mechelen, Delft, and Amsterdam was the exact path taken by the refugees. The wealthy Jewish families in Antwerp used their trade networks to finance and smuggle other fleeing Sephardic Jews out of Iberia, routing them safely to more tolerant cities. The Flemish refugees brought with them immense wealth, trade connections, and craftsmanship, which became a direct catalyst for the Dutch Golden Age. 17th-century Amsterdam was frequently referred to as the 'New Jerusalem' because the city had established itself as a unique sanctuary for Protestant groups and Jewish refugees.

Vermeer's father, Reijnier Janszoon, was born in Antwerp. In 1611, he moved to Amsterdam to apprentice as a silk weaver or caffa weaver (a mixture of silk and cotton or wool). (Note: His name was Reijnier or Reynier Janszoon, always written in Dutch as Jansz was his patronym. Reynier also used the pseudonym "Vos", meaning Fox. Satires like Reyne de Vos (Reynard the Fox) were popular consumer prints in the open Dutch market, serving as cultural propaganda that celebrated clever resistance against tyranny, corruption, and the old Catholic establishment. From 1640 onward, he had changed his alias to Vermeer.) He married Digna Baltens there in 1615. He was the son of Cornelia ”Neeltge” Goris Van der Minne/Meeren. (Note: Neeltge remarried three times, the second time shortly after Jan's death, in October 1597.) As an apprentice in Amsterdam, Reijnier lived on fashionable Sint Antoniesbreestraat, a street with many resident painters including Rembrandt. The area became well known during the 17th century for its growing Jewish population. Jewish immigrants early on specialized in the import, dyeing, and weaving of exclusive fabrics, especially silk and velvet, which became major export goods. Many worked as skilled craftsmen, watchmakers, and fine smiths, but they were often excluded from the traditional Christian trade guilds since guild statutes required Christian civic citizenship and adherence to specific religious traditions. Because of this, any artisan of hidden-Jewish descent was forced to work under a completely assimilated Christian identity.The powerful Guild of Saint Luke enforced strict rules on public sales, apprentice training, and master qualifications to protect local economic interests. The guild promoted its members by forbidding outside or foreign artists from selling their works in the city. The guild's overseers conducted inspections of estate sales, auctions, and markets to ensure that no unsigned or illegal artworks, books, or prints were sold secretly.

The couple moved to Delft and had a daughter named Gertruy who was baptized in 1620. (Note: In 1647 Geertruy, Vermeer's only sister, married a frame maker. She kept on working at the inn helping her parents, serving drinks and making beds.) In 1625, Reijnier was involved in a fight with a soldier named Willem van Bylandt who died from his wounds five months later. Around this time, Reijnier began dealing in paintings. In 1631, he leased an inn, which he called "The Flying Fox". Satires like Reyne de Vos (Reynard the Fox) were popular consumer prints in the open Dutch market, serving as cultural propaganda that celebrated clever resistance against tyranny, corruption, and the old Catholic establishment. The story has deep roots in Flandern and the Netherlands and had immense impact on the Protestant Reformation. Reijnier joined the Guild of Saint Luke as a master art dealer in 1631. In 1635, Reijnier lived on Voldersgracht 25 or 26. In 1641, he bought a larger inn on the market square, named after the Flemish town Mechelen. The acquisition of the inn constituted a considerable financial burden. Around 1640, Reijnier assumed the surname Vermeer. Johannes himself was registered under the name Johannes van der Meer in official documents, but usually signed his paintings as Johannes Vermeer. His father began using the surname van der Meer in the 1620s.This name can be traced back to Reijner's mother Cornelia "Neeltge" Goris Van der Minne/Meeren. When Reijnier died in October 1652, Vermeer took over the operation of the family's art business.

=== Marriage and family ===
In April 1653, Johannes Vermeer married a Catholic woman, Catharina Bolnes (Bolenes). The blessing took place in the quiet nearby village of Schipluiden. Vermeer's new mother-in-law, Maria Thins, was initially opposed to the marriage as she was significantly wealthier than he, and it was probably she who insisted that Vermeer convert to Catholicism before the marriage on 5 April. (Note: Catholicism was not a forbidden religion, but tolerated in the Dutch Republic. They were not allowed to build new churches, so services were held in hidden churches (so-called Schuilkerk). Catholics were restrained in their careers, unable to get high-rank jobs in city administration or civic guard. It was impossible to be elected as a member of the city council; therefore, the Catholics were not represented in the provincial and national assembly.) The fact that Vermeer's father was in considerable debt also did not help in discussions on the marriage. Leonaert Bramer, who was Catholic himself, put in a good word for Vermeer and it was this that led Maria to drop her oppositions. According to art historian Walter Liedtke, Vermeer's conversion seems to have been made with conviction. His painting The Allegory of Faith, made between 1670 and 1672, placed less emphasis on the artists' usual naturalistic concerns and more on symbolic religious applications, including the sacrament of the Eucharist. Walter Liedtke, in Dutch Paintings in the Metropolitan Museum of Art, suggests that it was made for a learned and devout Catholic patron, perhaps for his schuilkerk, or "hidden church". At some point, the couple moved in with Catharina's mother, who lived in a rather spacious house at Oude Langendijk, almost next to a hidden Jesuit church. (Note: A Roman Catholic chapel now exists at this spot.) There Vermeer lived for the rest of his life, producing paintings in the front room on the second floor. His wife gave birth to 15 children, four of whom were buried before being baptized but were registered as "child of Johan Vermeer".The names of 10 of Vermeer's children are known from wills written by relatives: Maertge, Elisabeth, Cornelia, Aleydis, Beatrix, Johannes, Gertruyd, Franciscus, Catharina, and Ignatius. Most of these names are those of saints; the youngest (Ignatius) was likely named after Ignatius of Loyola. (Note: The parish registers of the Delft Catholic church do not exist anymore, so it is impossible to prove but likely that his children were baptized in a hidden church.) (Note: The number of children seems inconsistent, but 11 was stated by his widow in a document to get help from the city council. One child died after this document was written.)

=== Career ===
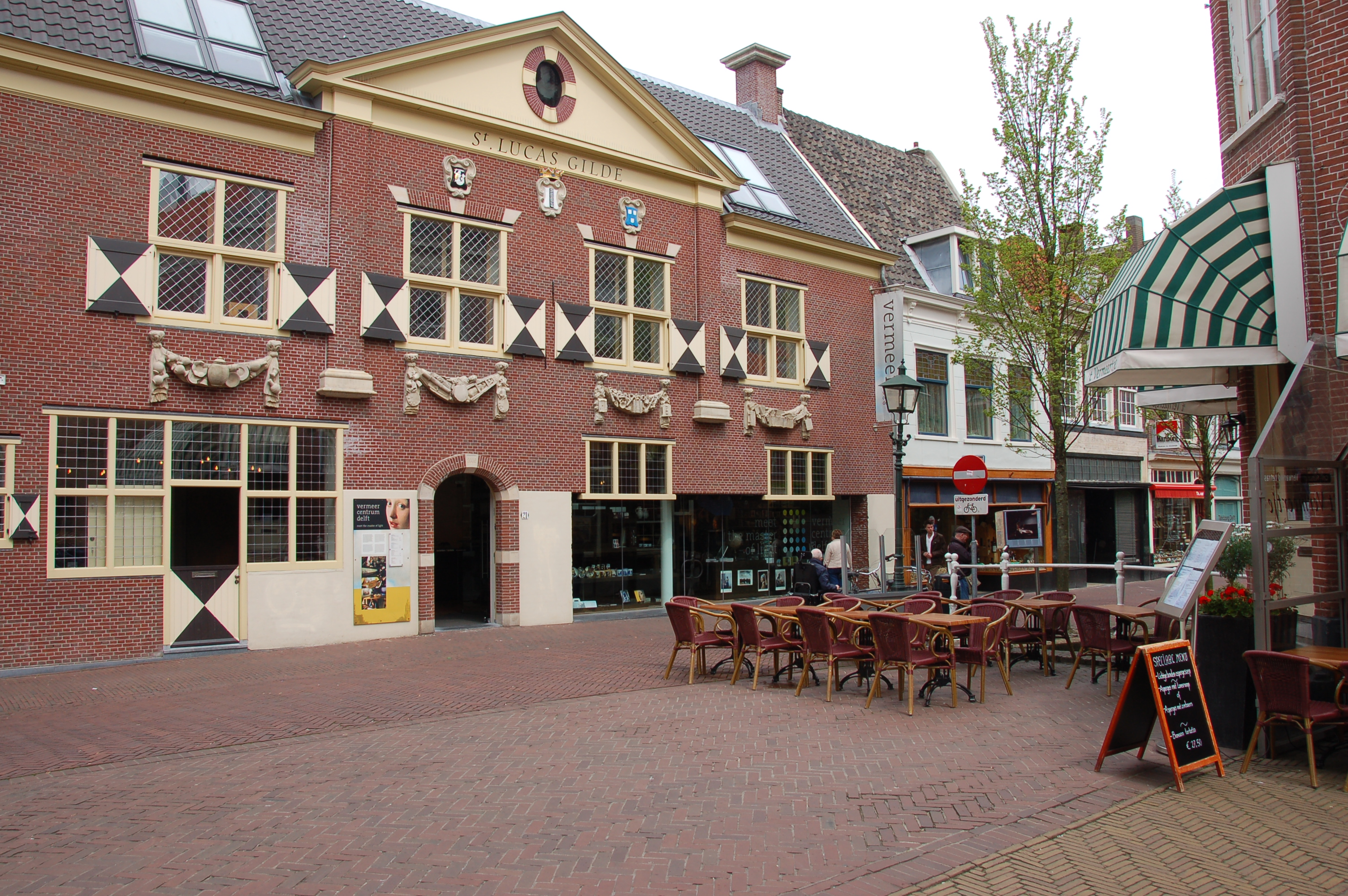
Replica of the St. Luke Guildhouse on Voldersgracht in Delft

It is unclear where and with whom Vermeer apprenticed as a painter. There is some speculation that Carel Fabritius may have been his teacher, based upon a controversial interpretation of a text written in 1668 by printer Arnold Bon. Art historians have found no hard evidence to support this. Local authority Leonaert Bramer acted as a friend, but his style of painting is rather different from Vermeer's. Liedtke suggests that Vermeer taught himself using information from one of his father's connections. Some scholars think that Vermeer was trained under Catholic painter Abraham Bloemaert. Vermeer's style is similar to that of some of the Utrecht Caravaggists, whose works are depicted as paintings-within-paintings in the backgrounds of several of his compositions. (Note: Identifiable works include compositions by Utrecht painters Baburen and Everdingen.)

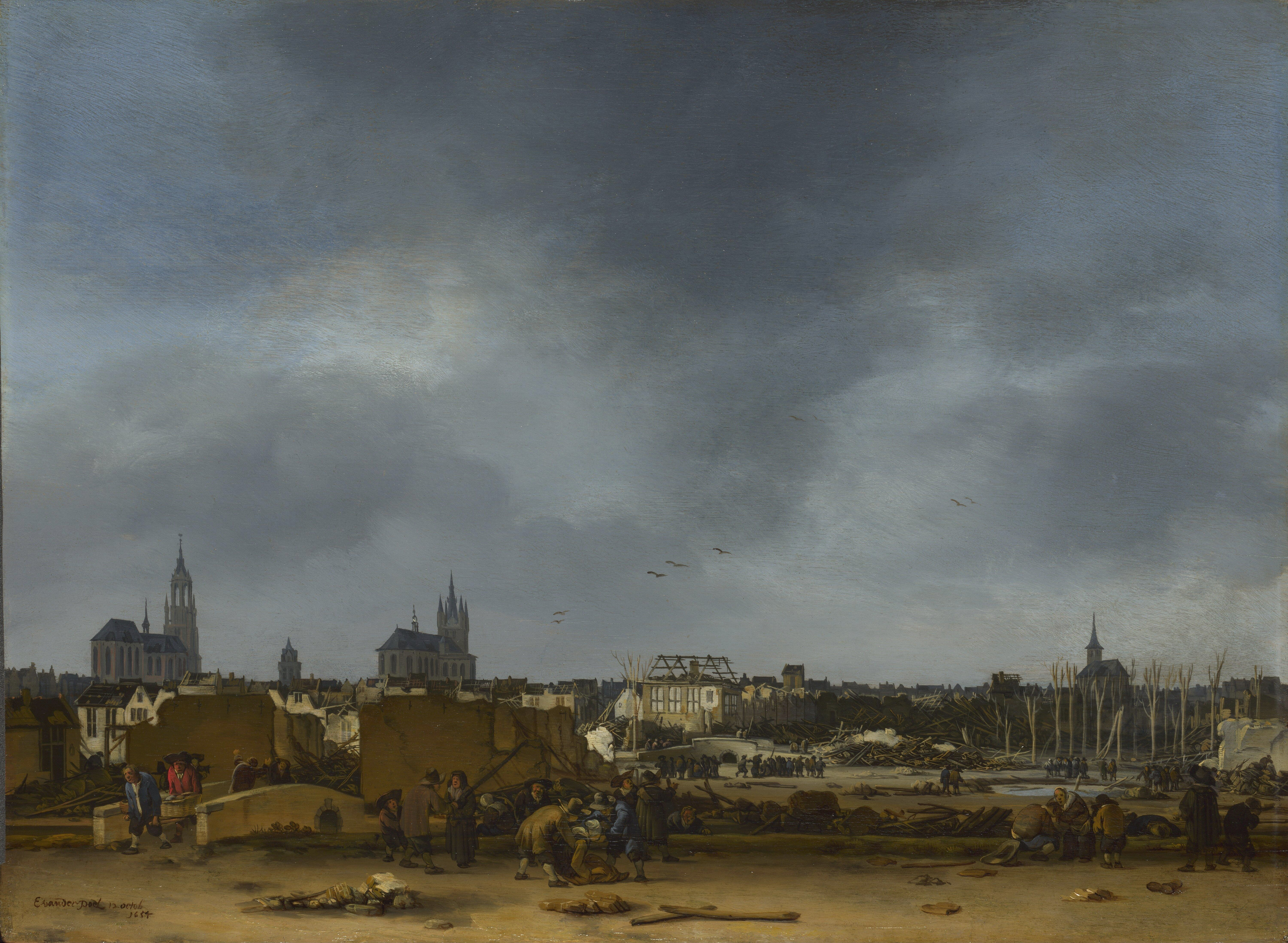
A View of Delft after the Explosion of 1654, by Egbert van der Poel

On 29 December 1653, Vermeer became a member of the Guild of Saint Luke, a trade association for painters. The guild's records make clear that Vermeer did not pay the usual admission fee. It was a year of plague, war, and economic crisis; Vermeer was not alone in experiencing difficult financial circumstances. In 1654, a terrible explosion, known as the Delft Thunderclap, occurred at a gunpowder store and destroyed a large section of the city. Pieter van Ruijven and his wife, Maria de Knuijt, were Vermeer's patrons for the better part of the artist's career. In 2023, Maria de Knuijt was identified by the curators of the 2023 exhibition of Vermeer's works at the Rijksmuseum in Amsterdam as the main patron because of her long-standing and supportive relationship with the artist. It seems that Vermeer turned for inspiration to the art of the fijnschilders from Leiden. Vermeer was responding to the market of Gerard Dou's paintings, who sold his paintings for exorbitant prices. Dou may have influenced Pieter de Hooch and Gabriel Metsu too. Vermeer also charged higher than average prices for his work, most of which were purchased by an unknown collector.

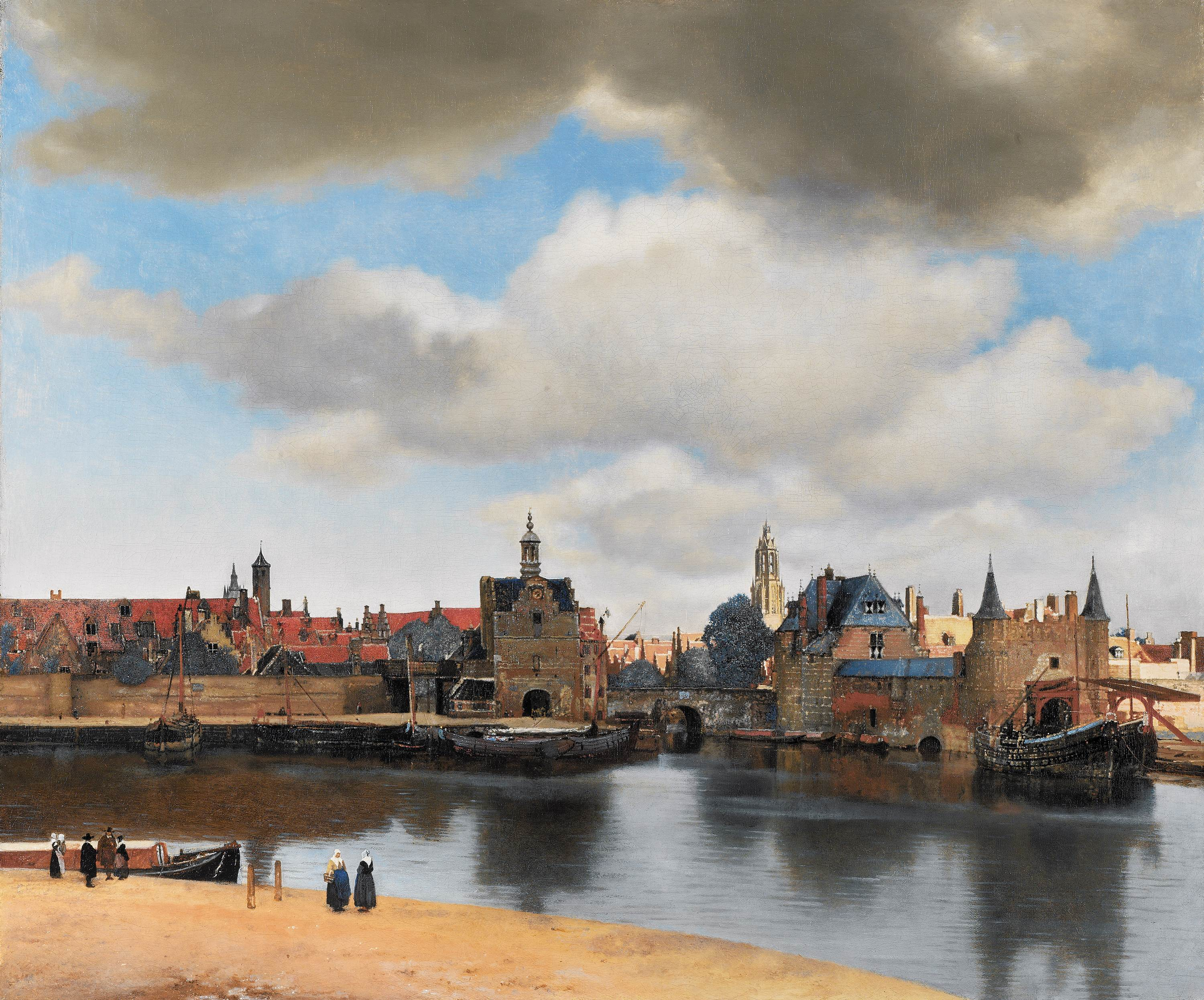
View of Delft (1660–1661): "He took a turbulent reality, and made it look like Heaven on earth."

The influence of Johannes Vermeer on Metsu is unmistakable: the light from the left, the marble floor. (Adriaan Waiboer, however, suggests that Metsu requires more emotional involvement of the viewer.) Vermeer probably competed also with Nicolaes Maes, who produced genre works in a similar style. In 1662, Vermeer was elected head of the guild and was reelected in 1663, 1670, and 1671, evidence that he (like Bramer) was considered an established craftsman among his peers. Vermeer worked slowly, probably producing three paintings a year on order. Balthasar de Monconys visited him in 1663 to see some of his work, but Vermeer had no paintings to show. The diplomat and the two French clergymen who accompanied him were sent to Hendrick van Buyten, a baker who had a couple of Vermeer's paintings as collateral.

In 1671, Gerrit van Uylenburgh organized the auction of Gerrit Reynst's collection and offered 13 paintings and some sculptures to Frederick William, Elector of Brandenburg. Frederick accused them of being counterfeits and sent 12 back on the advice of Hendrick Fromantiou. Van Uylenburg then organized a counter-assessment, asking a total of 35 painters to pronounce on their authenticity, including Jan Lievens, Melchior de Hondecoeter, Gerbrand van den Eeckhout, and Johannes Vermeer.

=== Wars and death ===
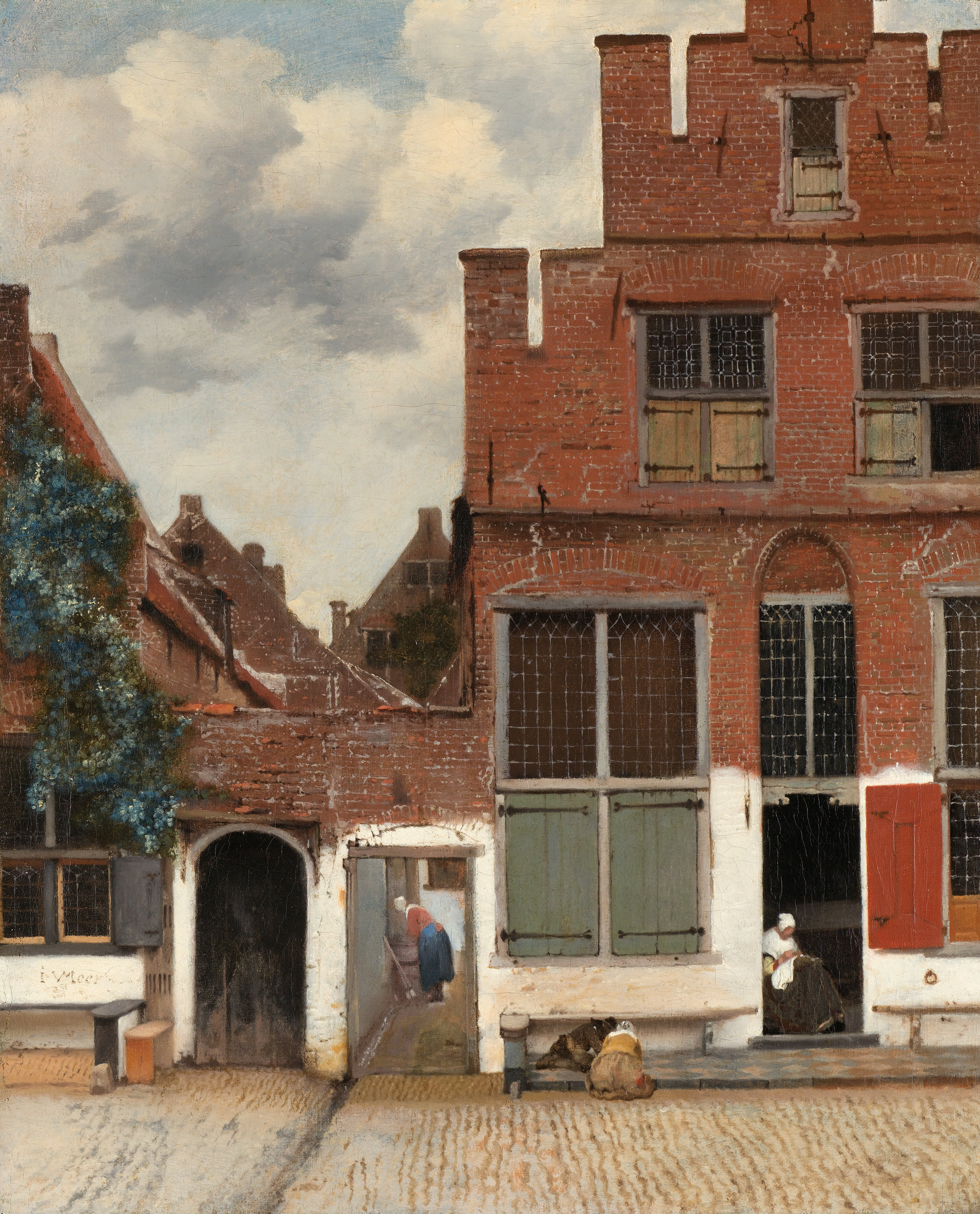
The Little Street (1657–1658)

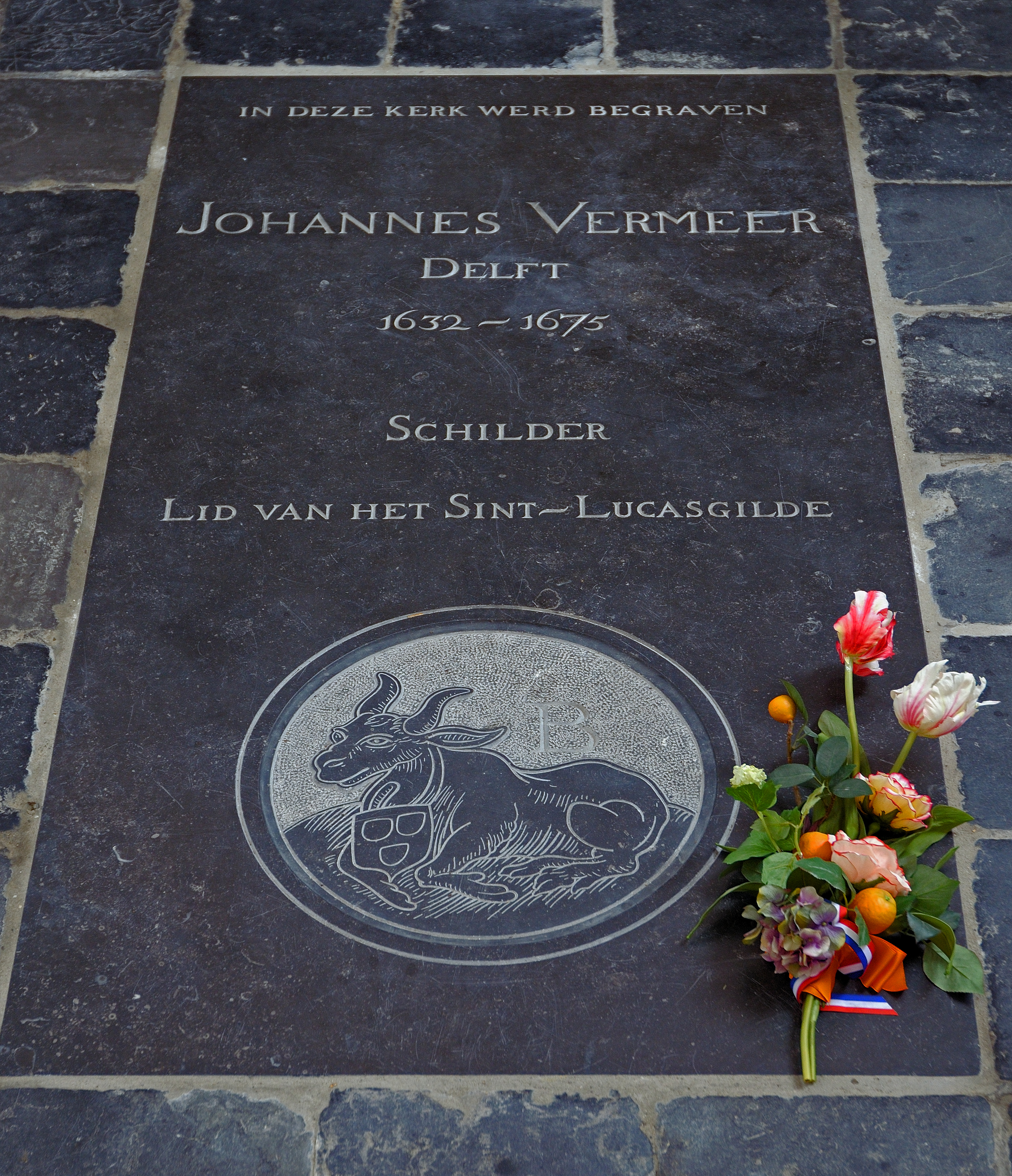
Memorial (2007) of Johannes Vermeer in Oude Kerk. Delft, Netherlands

In 1672, a severe economic downturn known as the Rampjaar struck the Dutch Republic, after French troops led by Louis XIV invaded the country from the south during the Franco-Dutch War. At the same time, troops from Münster and Cologne invaded the country from the east, causing more destruction. Many people panicked; courts, theaters, shops and schools were closed. Vermeer's sale of a painting that year was his last. Five years passed before circumstances improved. In 1674, Vermeer was listed as a member of the civic guards. In the summer of 1675, Vermeer borrowed 1,000 guilders in Amsterdam from Jacob Romboutsz (grandfather of Hendrick Sorgh), an Amsterdam silk trader, using his mother-in-law's property as a surety.

Vermeer died on 15 December 1675, after a short illness. He was 43 years old and was buried in the Protestant Old Church on the same day. (Note: He was baptized as Joannis, but buried under the name Jan.) (Note: When Catharina Bolnes was buried in 1688, she was registered as the "widow of Johan Vermeer".) In a petition to her creditors, Catharina Bolnes attributed her husband's death to the stress of financial pressures, and described his death as follows:

... during the ruinous war with France he not only was unable to sell any of his art but also, to his great detriment, was left sitting with the paintings of other masters that he was dealing in. As a result and owing to the great burden of his children having no means of his own, he lapsed into such decay and decadence, which he had so taken to heart that, as if he had fallen into a frenzy, in a day and a half he went from being healthy to being dead.

Catharina describes how the collapse of the art market had damaged Vermeer's business as both a painter and an art dealer. She had to raise 11 children and therefore asked the High Court to relieve her of debts owed to Vermeer's creditors. Pioneering Dutch microscopist Antonie van Leeuwenhoek, who worked for the city council as a surveyor, was appointed trustee. The house had eight rooms on the first floor, the contents of which were listed in an inventory taken a few months after Vermeer's death. In his studio, there were two chairs, two painter's easels, three palettes, 10 canvases, a desk, an oak pull table, a small wooden cupboard with drawers, and "rummage not worthy being itemized". Nineteen of Vermeer's paintings were bequeathed to Catharina and her mother. The widow sold two more paintings to Hendrick van Buyten to pay off a substantial debt.

Vermeer had been a respected artist in Delft, but he was almost unknown outside his hometown. A local patron named Pieter van Ruijven had purchased much of his output, which kept Vermeer afloat financially but reduced the possibility of his fame spreading. (Note: Van Ruijven's son-in-law Jacob Dissius owned 21 paintings by Vermeer, listed in his heritage in 1695. These paintings were sold in Amsterdam the following year in a much-studied auction, published by Gerard Hoet.) Several factors contributed to his limited body of work. Vermeer never had any pupils, though one scholar has suggested that Vermeer taught his eldest daughter Maria to paint. Additionally, his family obligations with so many children may have taken up much of his time, as would acting as both an art dealer and inn-keeper in running the family businesses. His time spent serving as head of the guild and his extraordinary precision as a painter may have also limited his output.

== Style ==
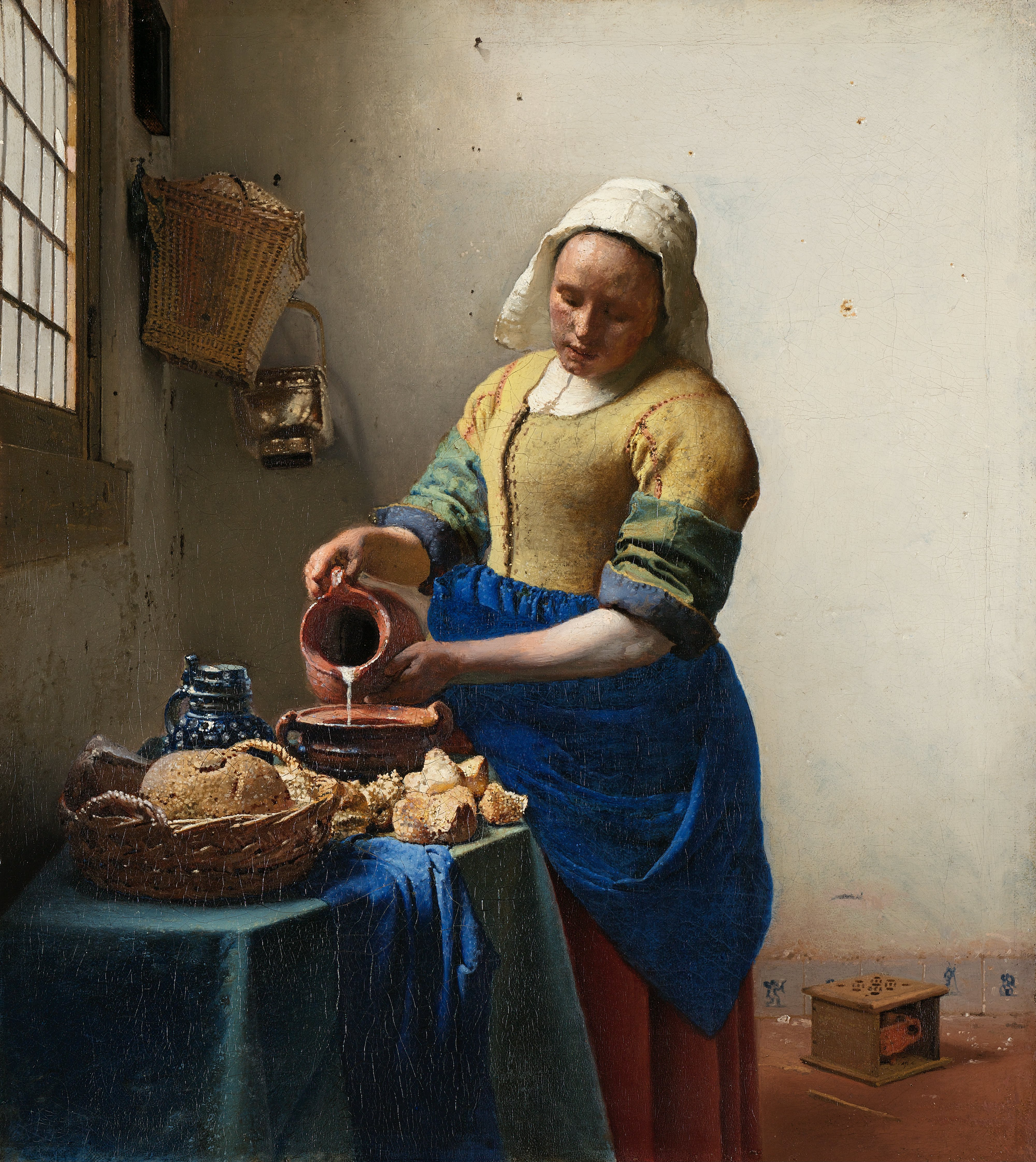
The Milkmaid (c. 1658), Rijksmuseum in Amsterdam

Vermeer may have first executed his paintings tonally like most painters of his time, using either monochrome shades of grey ("grisaille") or a limited palette of browns and greys ("dead coloring"), over which he would apply more saturated colors (reds, yellows, and blues) in the form of transparent glazes. No drawings have been positively attributed to Vermeer, and his paintings offer few clues to preparatory methods.

There is no other 17th-century artist who employed the exorbitantly expensive pigment ultramarine (derived from natural lapis lazuli) either so lavishly or so early in his career. Vermeer used this pigment in not just elements that are naturally of this colour; he also used it early in a work, beneath subsequent earth colours such as umber and ochre, to subtly tint their shade. This working method most probably was inspired by Vermeer's understanding of Leonardo's observations that the surface of every object partakes of the colour of the adjacent object.

An example of Vermeer using ultramarine as an underpaint is in The Girl with the Wine Glass. The shadows of the red satin dress are underpainted in natural ultramarine, and, owing to this underlying blue paint layer, the red lake and vermilion mixture applied over it acquires a slightly purple, cool and crisp appearance.

Even after Vermeer's evident financial breakdown following the so-called rampjaar (year of disaster) in 1672, he continued to employ natural ultramarine generously, such as in Lady Seated at a Virginal. This could suggest that Vermeer was supplied with materials by a collector and would coincide with John Michael Montias' theory that Pieter van Ruijven was Vermeer's patron.

Vermeer's works are largely genre pieces and portraits, with the exception of two cityscapes and two allegories. His subjects offer a cross-section of seventeenth-century Dutch society, ranging from the portrayal of a simple milkmaid at work, to the luxury and splendour of rich notables and merchantmen in their roomy houses. Besides these subjects, religious, poetical, musical, and scientific comments can also be found in his work.

=== Painting materials ===
One aspect of his meticulous painting technique was Vermeer's choice of pigments. He is best known for his frequent use of the very expensive ultramarine (The Milkmaid) and also lead-tin-yellow (A Lady Writing a Letter), madder lake (Christ in the House of Martha and Mary), and vermilion. He also painted with ochres, bone black and azurite. The claim that he used Indian yellow in Woman Holding a Balance has been disproven by pigment analysis.

In Vermeer's oeuvre, only about 20 pigments have been detected. Of these, seven principal pigments that Vermeer commonly employed are lead white, yellow ochre, vermilion, madder lake, green earth, raw umber, and ivory or bone black.

=== Theories of mechanical aid ===
Vermeer's painting techniques have long been a source of debate, given their almost photorealistic attention to detail, despite Vermeer's having had no formal training and despite only limited evidence that Vermeer had created any preparatory sketches or traces for his paintings.

In 2001, British artist David Hockney published the book Secret Knowledge: Rediscovering the Lost Techniques of the Old Masters, in which he argued that Vermeer (among other Renaissance and Baroque artists including Hans Holbein and Diego Velázquez) used optics to achieve precise positioning in their compositions, and specifically some combination of curved mirrors, camera obscura, and camera lucida. This became known as the Hockney–Falco thesis, named after Hockney and Charles M. Falco, another proponent of the theory.

Philip Steadman published the book Vermeer's Camera: Uncovering the Truth behind the Masterpieces in 2001, in which Steadman specifically claimed that Vermeer had used a camera obscura to create his paintings. Steadman noted that many of Vermeer's paintings had been painted in the same room, and he found six of Vermeer's paintings that would be precisely the right size if they had been painted from inside a camera obscura in the room's back wall.

Supporters of these theories have pointed to evidence in some of Vermeer's paintings, such as the often-discussed sparkling pearly highlights in Vermeer's paintings, which they argue are the result of the primitive lens of a camera obscura producing halation. It was also postulated that a camera obscura was the mechanical cause of the "exaggerated" perspective seen in The Music Lesson (London, Royal Collection).

In 2008, American entrepreneur and inventor Tim Jenison developed the theory that Vermeer had used a camera obscura along with a "comparator mirror", which is similar in concept to a camera lucida but much simpler and makes it easy to match colour values. Jenison later modified the theory to simply involve a concave mirror and a comparator mirror. He spent the next five years testing his theory by re-creating The Music Lesson himself using these tools, a process captured in the 2013 documentary film Tim's Vermeer.

Several points were brought out by Jenison in support of this technique. First was Vermeer's hyper-accurate rendition of light falloff along the wall. Neurobiologist Colin Blakemore, in an interview with Jenison, notes that human vision cannot process information about the absolute brightness of a scene. Another was the addition of several highlights and outlines consistent with matching the effects of chromatic aberration, particularly noticeable in primitive optics. Last, and perhaps most telling, is a noticeable curvature in the original painting's rendition of the scrollwork on the virginal. This effect matched Jenison's technique precisely, caused by exactly duplicating the view as seen from a curved mirror.

This theory remains disputed. While there is no historical evidence regarding Vermeer's interest in optics, Vermeer was in close connection with pioneer lens maker Antonie van Leeuwenhoek, who was his executor after death. The detailed inventory of the artist's belongings drawn up after his death includes no camera obscura, lens, nor similar device. (Note: The inventory taken soon after Vermeer's death does not mention a camera obscura, although it does include mirrors, easels, palettes, canvases, and a possible maulstick. Gold, silver, jewellery, or musical instruments are not mentioned; it has been suggested that Catharina Bolnes might have removed any valuables from the house to conceal them from her creditors, or pawned the jewels and gold and silver.)

== Works ==
It is believed Vermeer produced a total of fewer than 50 paintings, of which 34 have survived. Only three Vermeer paintings were dated by the artist: The Procuress (1656; Gemäldegalerie, Dresden); The Astronomer (1668; Musée du Louvre, Paris); and The Geographer (1669; Städelsches Kunstinstitut, Frankfurt).

Vermeer's mother-in-law, Maria Thins, owned Dirck van Baburen's 1622 oil on canvas The Procuress (or a copy of it), which appears in the background of two of Vermeer's paintings. The same subject was also painted by Vermeer. Almost all of Vermeer's paintings are of contemporary subjects in a smaller format, with a cooler palette dominated by blues, yellows, and grays. Vermeer painted multiple artworks portraying a pure profile like the painting Woman with a Pearl Necklace, which was uncommon in Dutch art at the time. Practically all of his surviving works belong to this period, usually domestic interiors with one or two figures lit by a window on the left. They are characterized by a sense of compositional balance and spatial order, unified by a pearly light. Mundane domestic or recreational activities are imbued with a poetic timelessness (e.g., Girl Reading a Letter at an Open Window, Dresden, Gemäldegalerie). Vermeer's two townscapes have also been attributed to this period: View of Delft (The Hague, Mauritshuis) and The Little Street (Amsterdam, Rijksmuseum).

A few of his paintings show a certain hardening of manner and are generally thought to represent his late works. From this period come The Allegory of Faith (c. 1670; Metropolitan Museum of Art, New York) and The Love Letter (c. 1670; Rijksmuseum, Amsterdam).

== Legacy ==
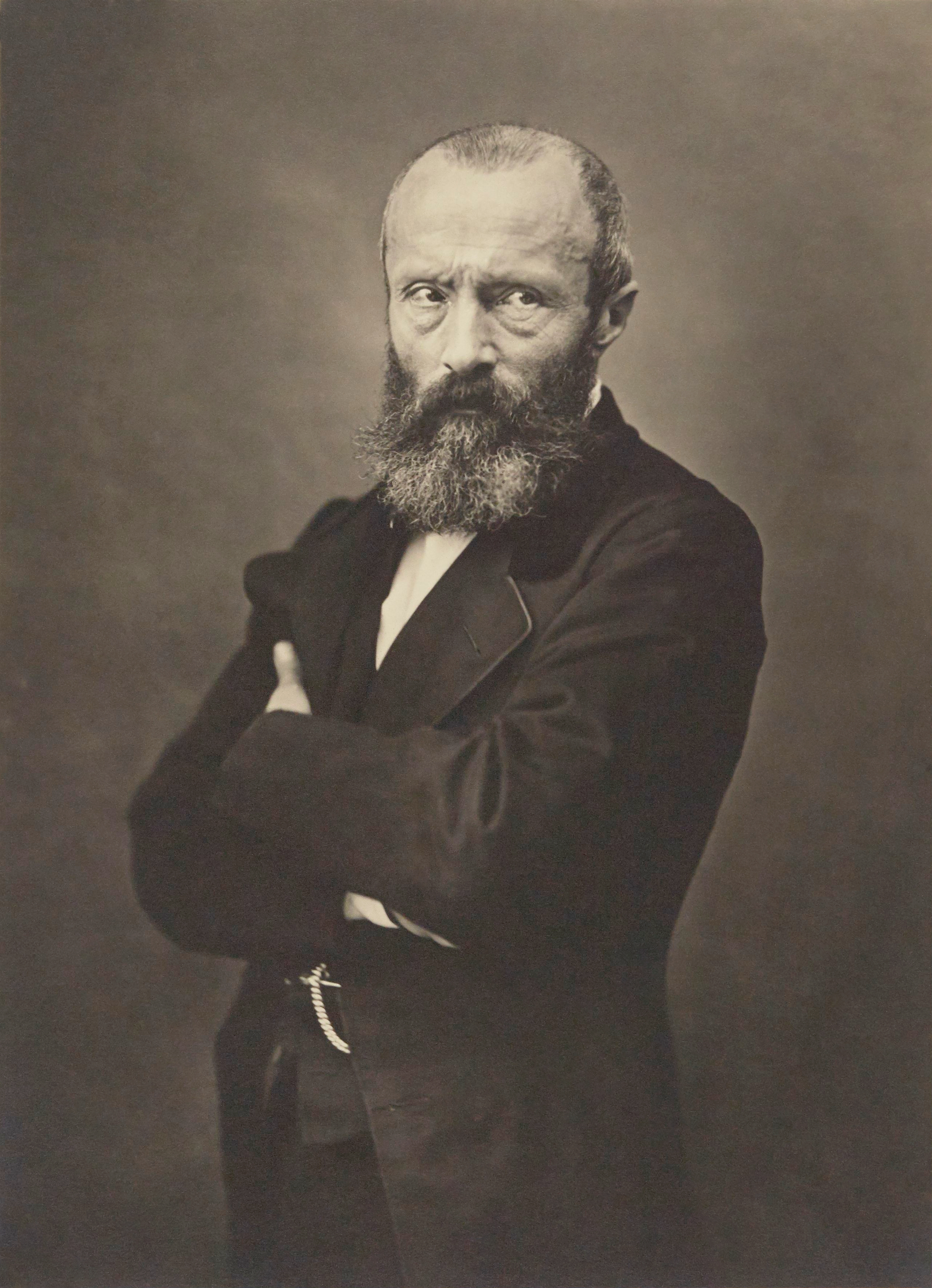
Théophile Thoré-Bürger

Vermeer's works went mostly unnoticed by art historians during the two centuries following his death. Although select connoisseurs in the Netherlands did appreciate his work, many of his paintings were attributed to then better-known artists such as Metsu or Mieris. The modern revival of interest in Vermeer began in the 1860s, when German museum director Gustav Waagen recognized the hand of Vermeer in the Czernin gallery in Vienna, where The Art of Painting had been misattributed to Pieter de Hooch. Research by Théophile Thoré-Bürger culminated in the publication of his catalogue raisonné of Vermeer's works in the Gazette des Beaux-Arts in 1866. Thoré-Bürger's catalogue drew international attention to Vermeer, to whom more than 70 works were ascribed, including many that Thoré-Bürger regarded as uncertain. In the years following this rediscovery, several prominent Dutch artists, such as Simon Duiker, adopted Vermeer's style. Other artists who were inspired by Vermeer include Danish painter Wilhelm Hammershoi and American Thomas Wilmer Dewing. In the 20th century, Vermeer's admirers included Salvador Dalí, who painted his own version of The Lacemaker (on commission from collector Robert Lehman) and pitted large copies of the original against a rhinoceros in some surrealist experiments. Dali also celebrated the master in The Ghost of Vermeer of Delft Which Can Be Used As a Table, 1934.

Han van Meegeren was a 20th-century Dutch painter who worked in the classical tradition. He became a master forger, motivated by a blend of aesthetic and financial reasons, creating and selling many new "Vermeers" before turning himself in for forgery to avoid being charged with capital treason for collaboration with the Nazis, specifically in selling what had been believed to be original artwork to the Nazis.

The Concert was stolen during the Isabella Stewart Gardner Museum theft in 1990 and remains unrecovered.

In 1971, The Love Letter was stolen from the Fine Arts Palace in Brussels, where it was on loan from the Rijksmuseum for the exhibition Rembrandt and his Age. The painting was recovered after two weeks.

To mark the 26th anniversary of the opening of an exhibition at Washington, DC's National Gallery of Art featuring Vermeer's work, Google honored Vermeer with a Google Doodle on 12 November 2021.

A 2023 exhibition at the Rijksmuseum in Amsterdam featured 28 of Vermeer's works, the most ever shown together. More than 650,000 people visited the exhibition, making it the museum's most visited exhibition. Coinciding with the exhibition, the documentary film Close to Vermeer was released the same year. The film followed curators Gregor J. M. Weber and Pieter Roelofs as they sought loans of Vermeer's artwork from museums around the world. Also released in 2023 was another movie about the exhibition at the Rijkmuseum: Vermeer: The Greatest Exhibition. (External links to both movies are below.)

== In popular culture ==
Vermeer's name and works have been featured in both literature and in films. Tracy Chevalier's novel Girl with a Pearl Earring (1999) and the 2003 film of the same name present a fictional account of Vermeer's creation of the famous painting and his relationship with the equally fictional model.

== Gallery of selected works ==
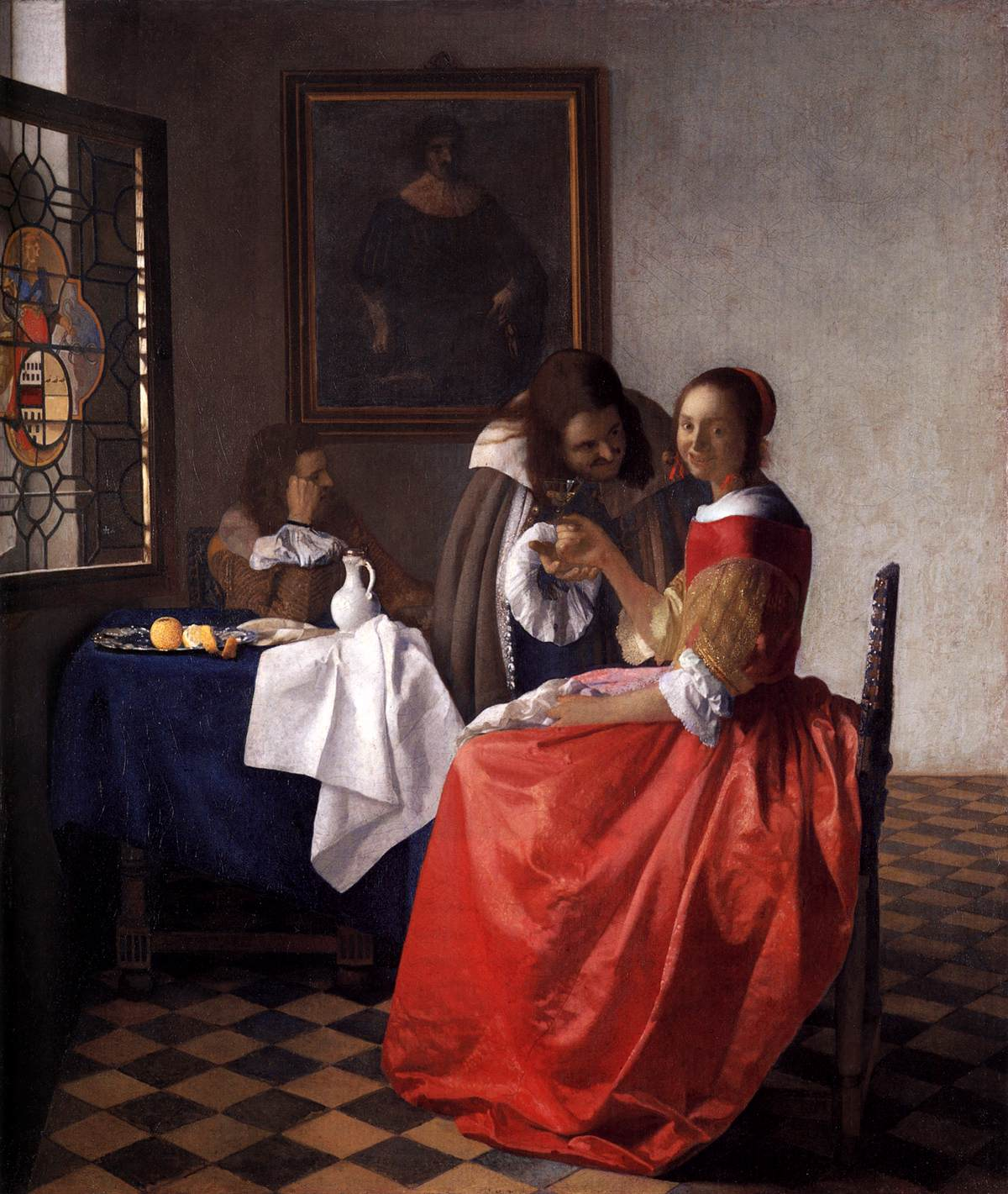
The Girl with the Wine Glass (c. 1659), Herzog Anton Ulrich Museum in Brunswick, Germany

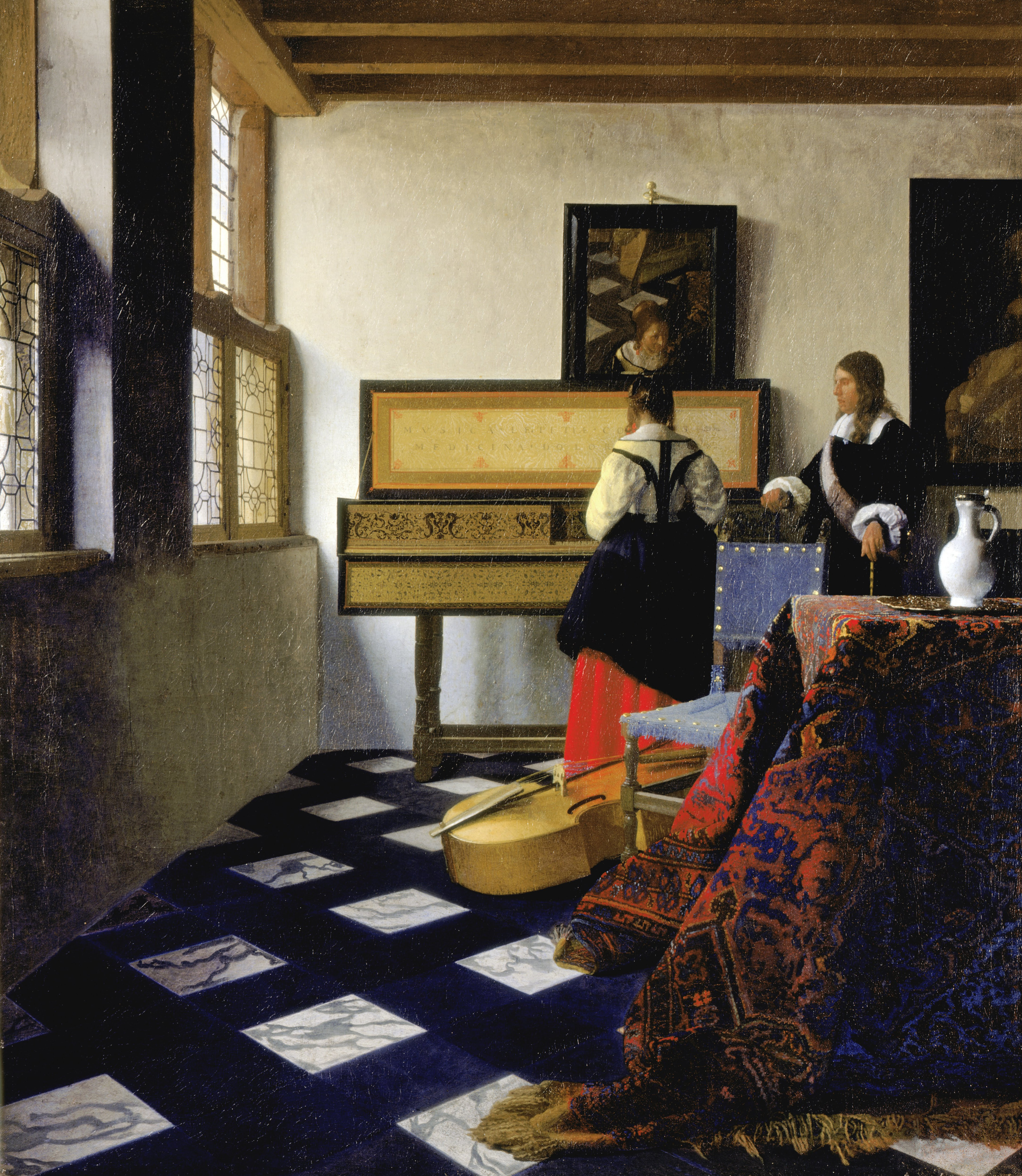
The Music Lesson or A Lady at the Virginals with a Gentleman (c. 1662–1665), Royal Collection in London

Girl with a Pearl Earring (1665), considered a Vermeer masterpiece, Mauritshuis in Den Haag

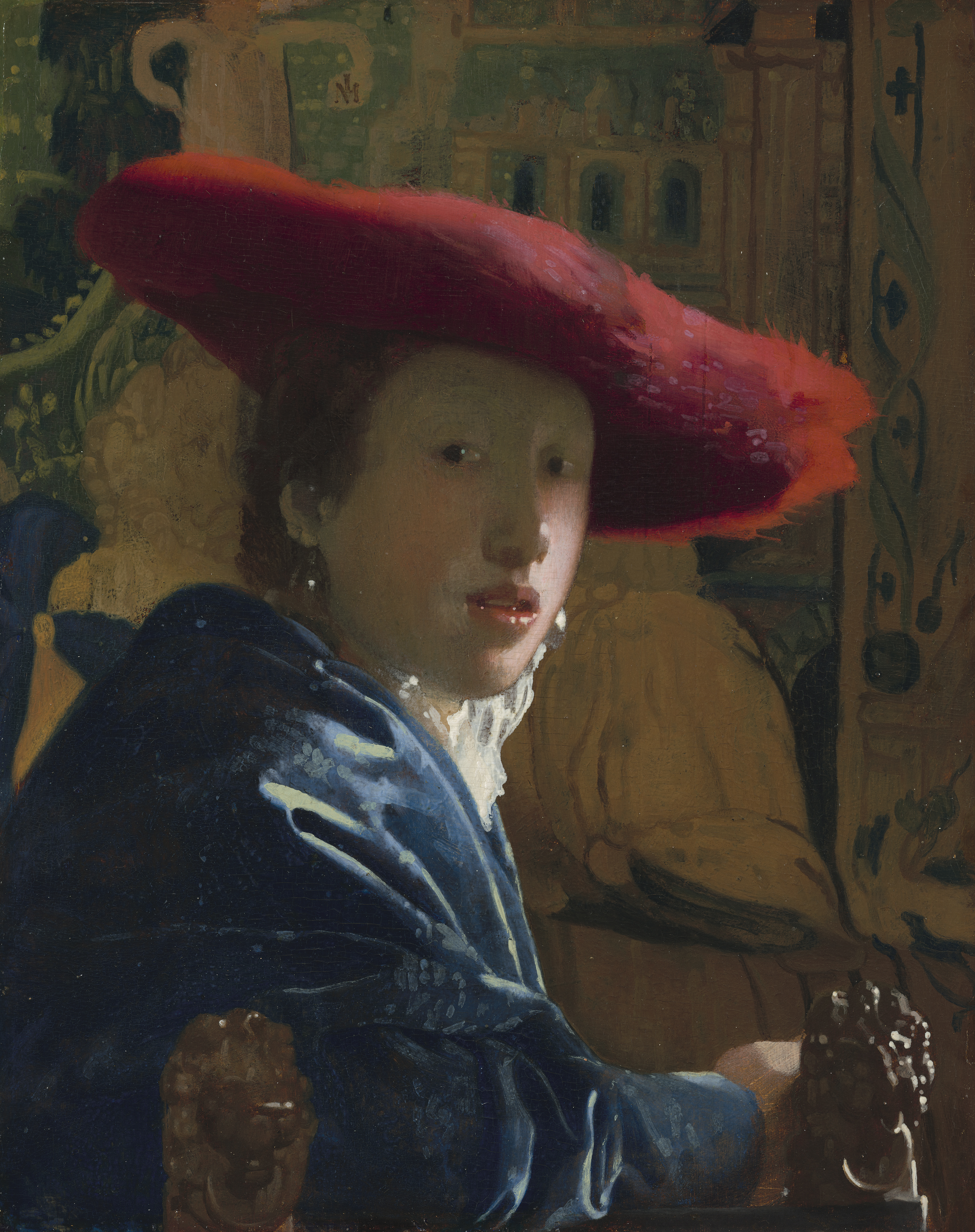
Girl with the Red Hat (c. 1665–1666), National Gallery of Art in Washington, D.C.

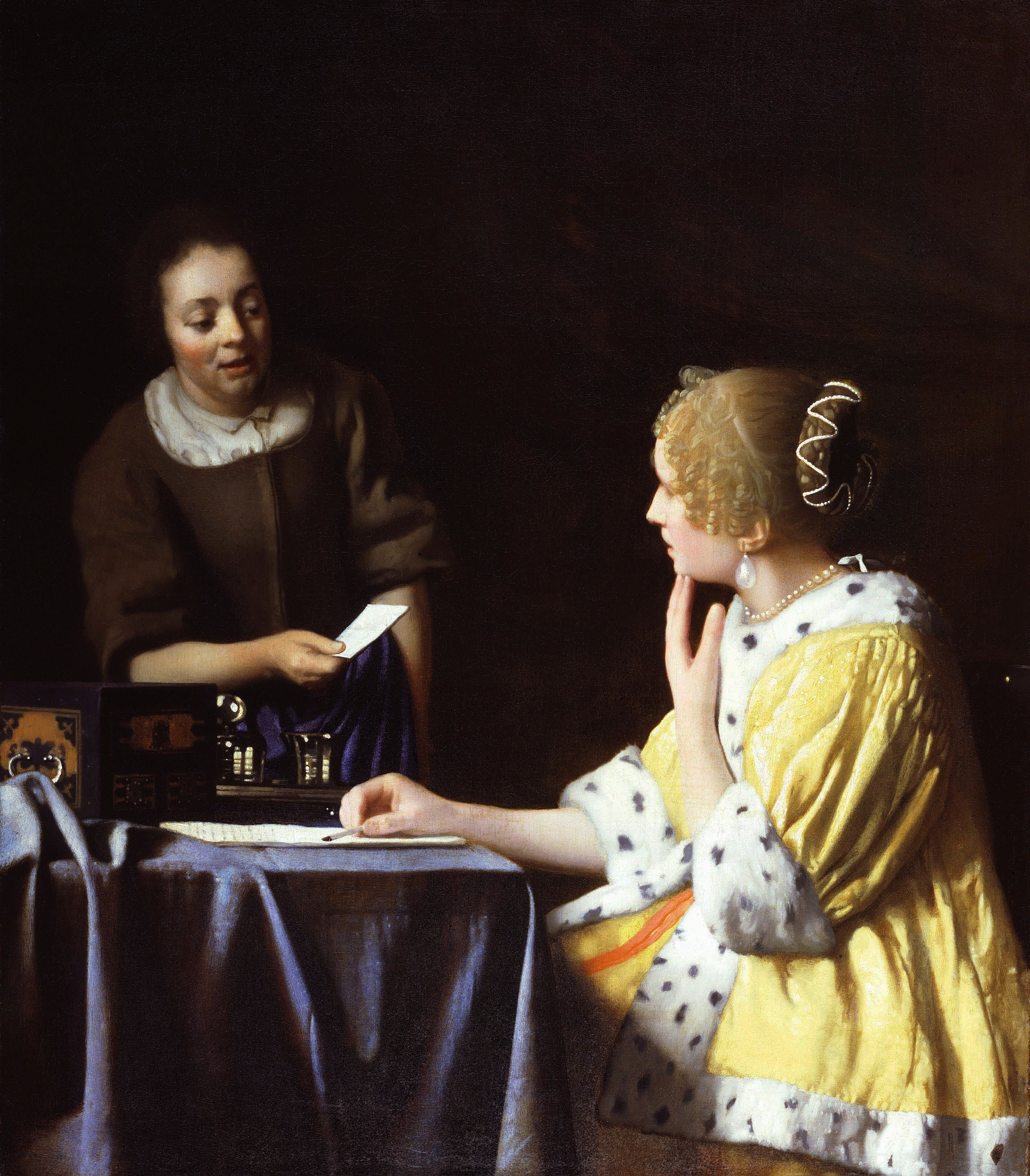
Mistress and Maid (1666–1667), Frick Collection in New York City

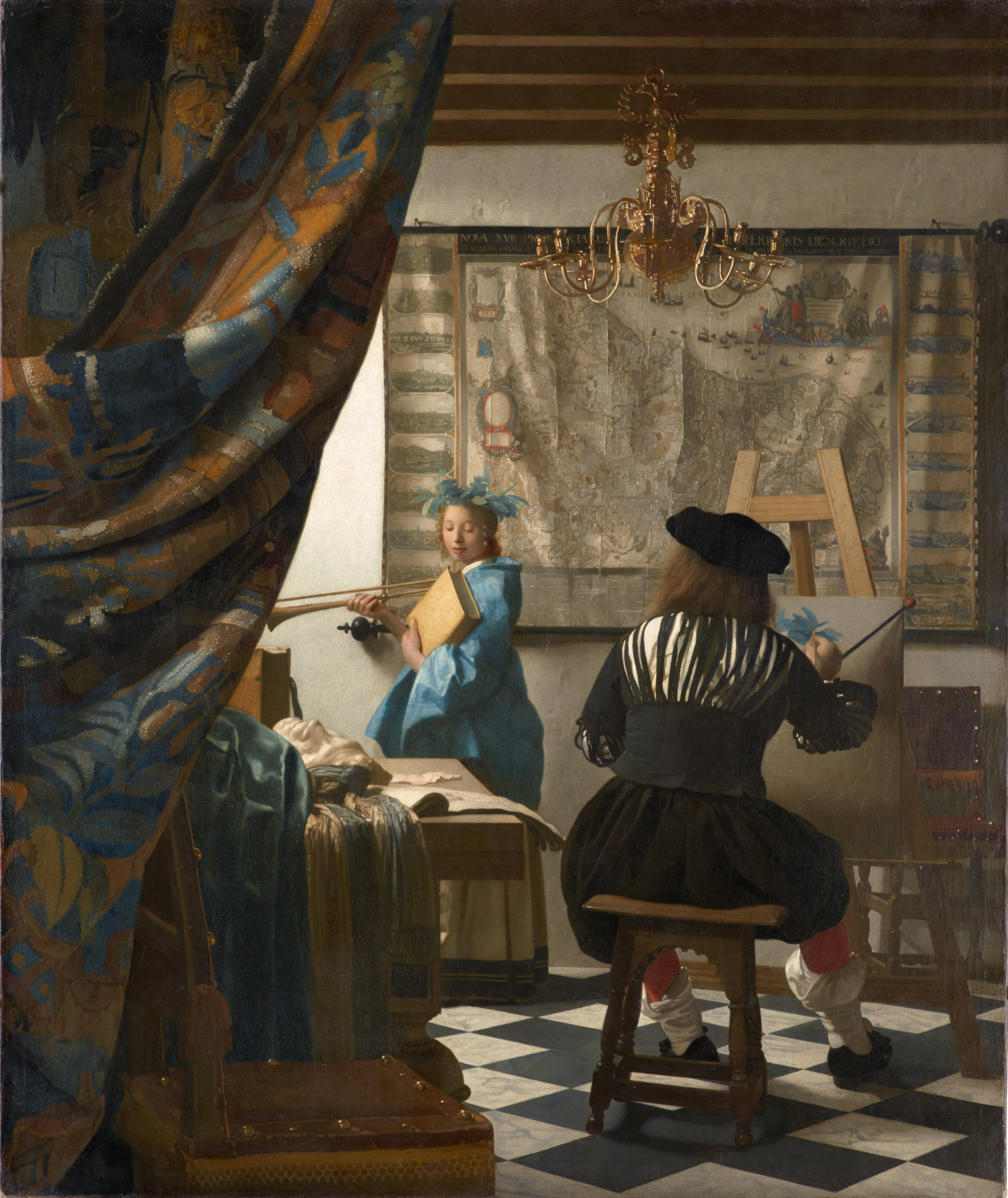
The Art of Painting or The Allegory of Painting (c. 1666–1668), Kunsthistorisches Museum in Vienna

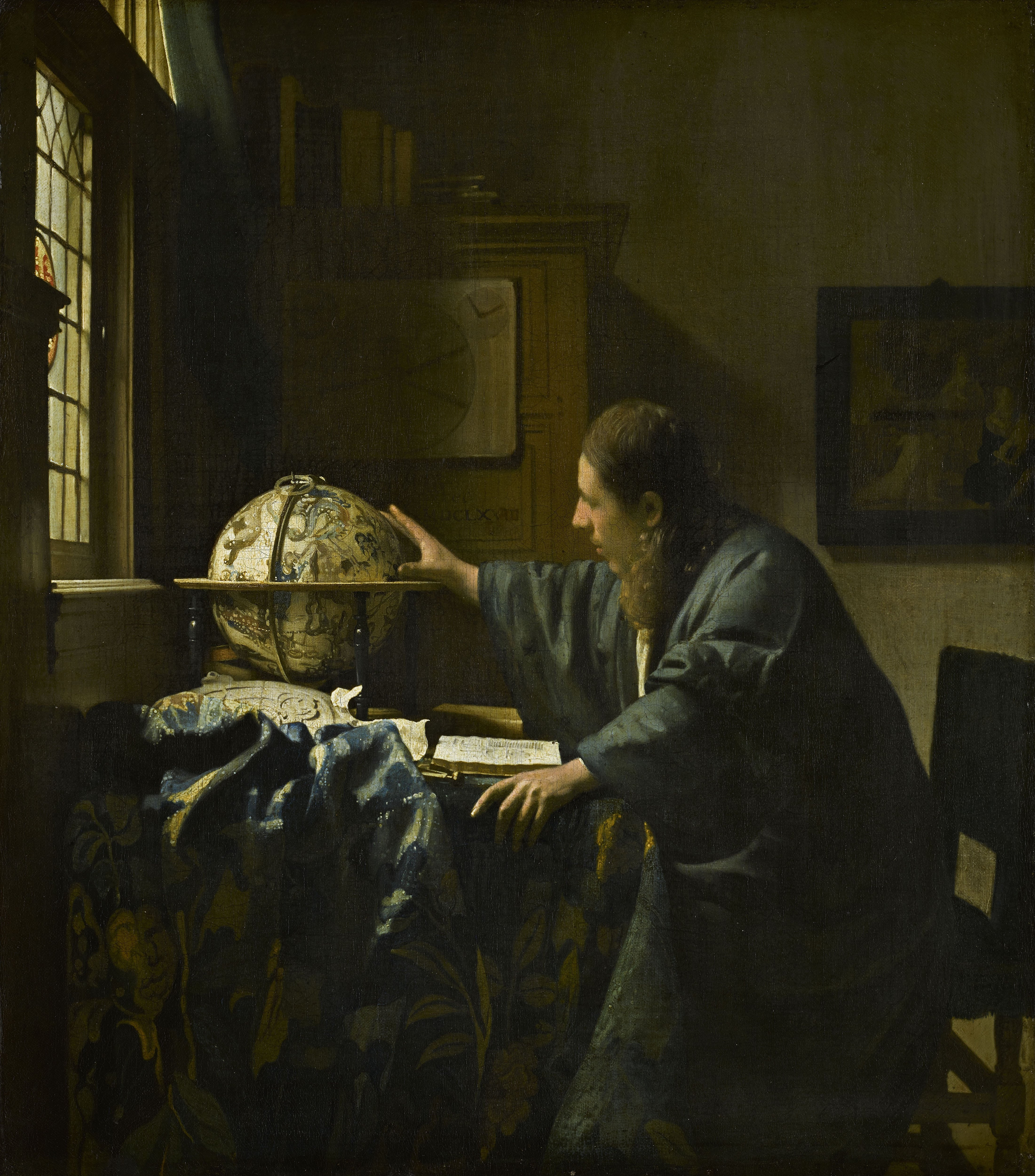
The Astronomer (c. 1668), Musée du Louvre in Paris

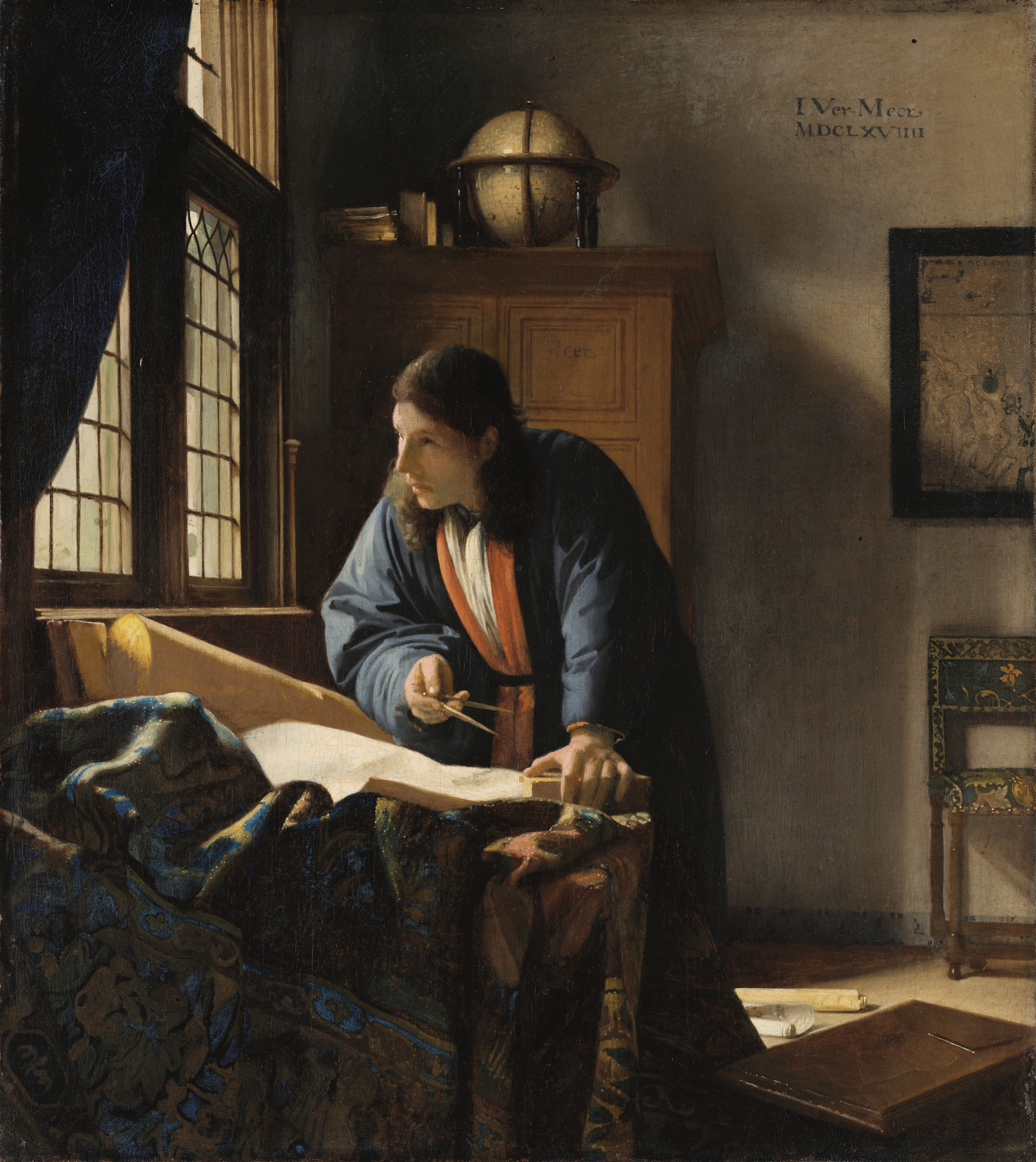
The Geographer (1669), Städel Museum in Frankfurt am Main

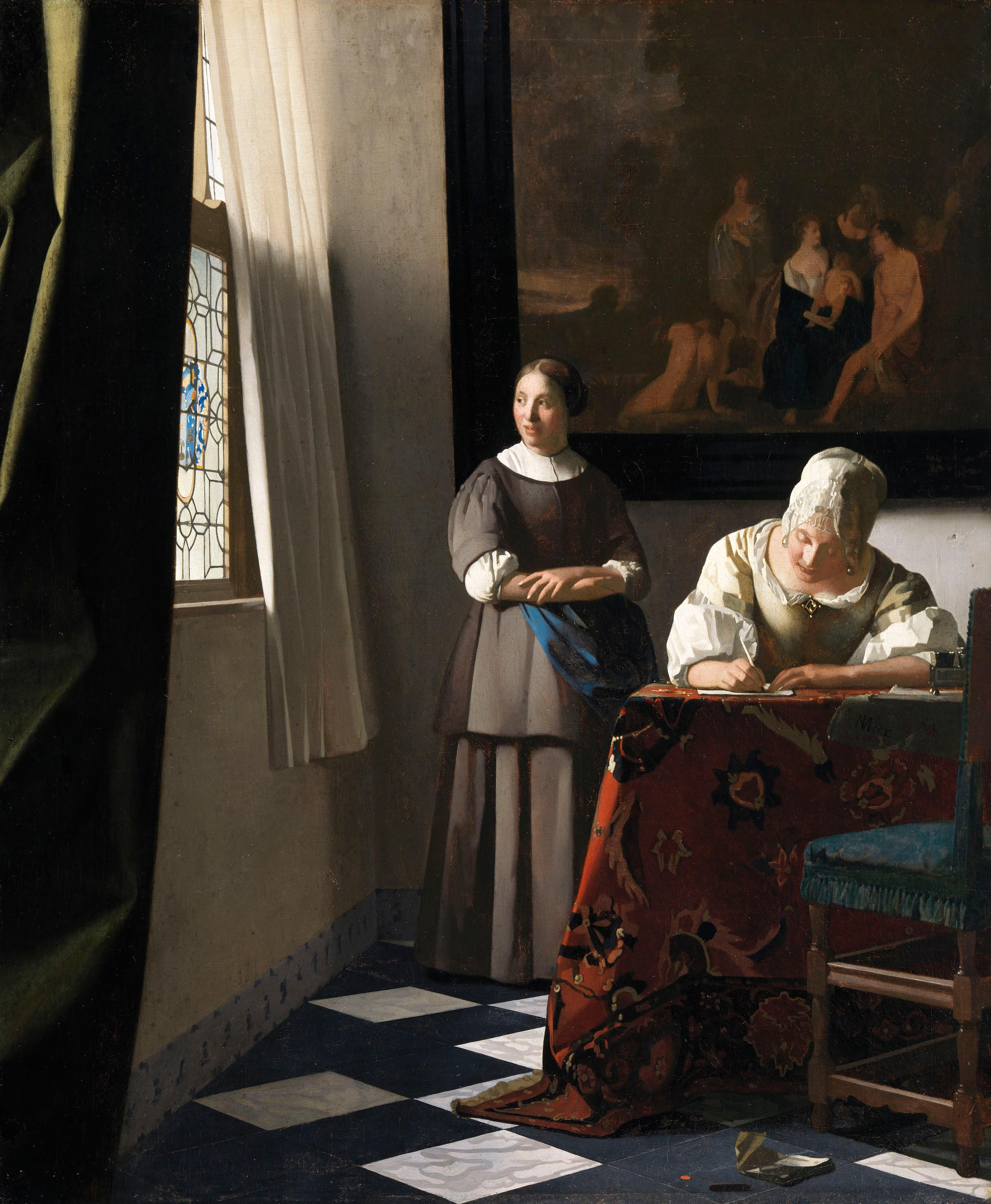
Lady Writing a Letter with her Maid (c. 1670–1671), National Gallery of Ireland in Dublin, Ireland

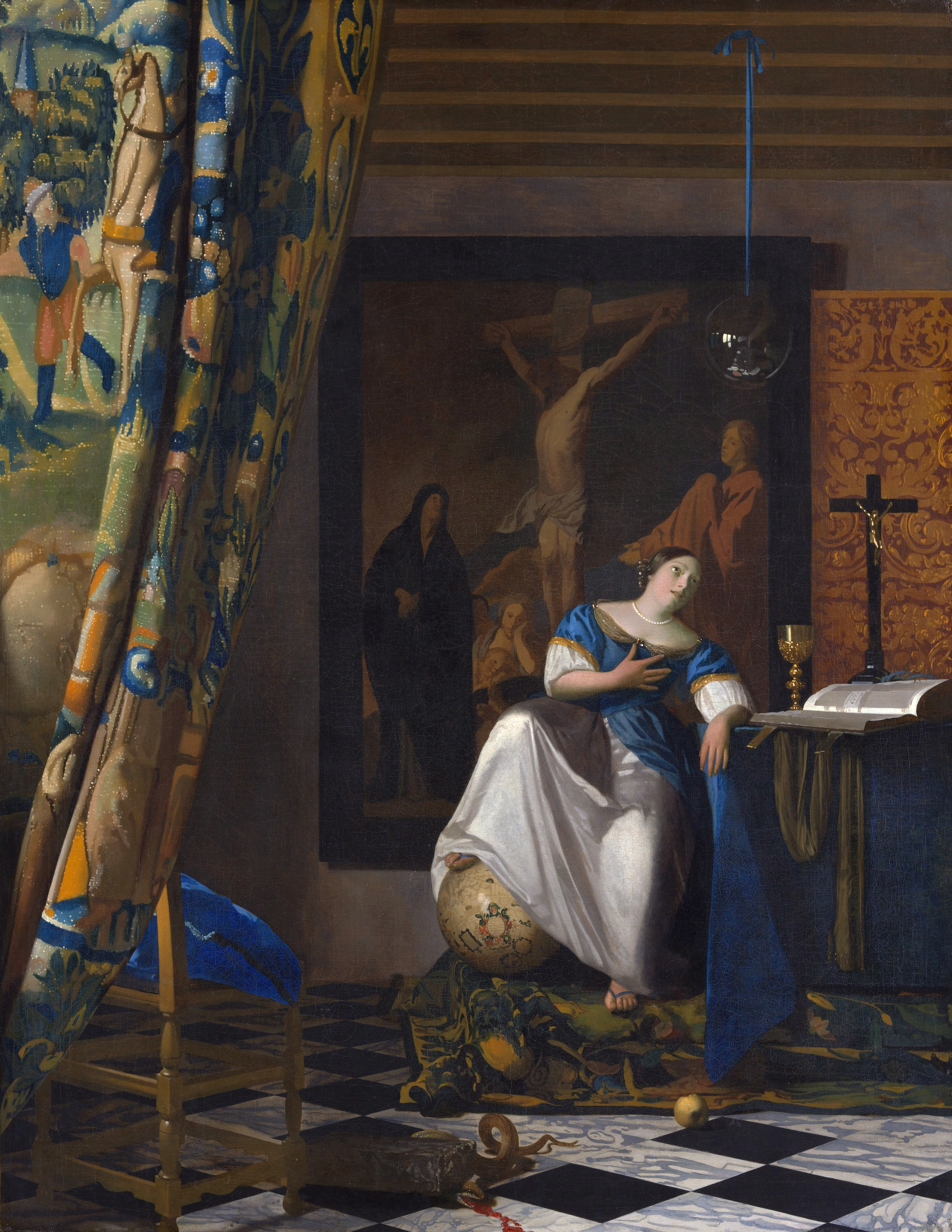
The Allegory of Faith (1670–1672), Metropolitan Museum of Art in New York

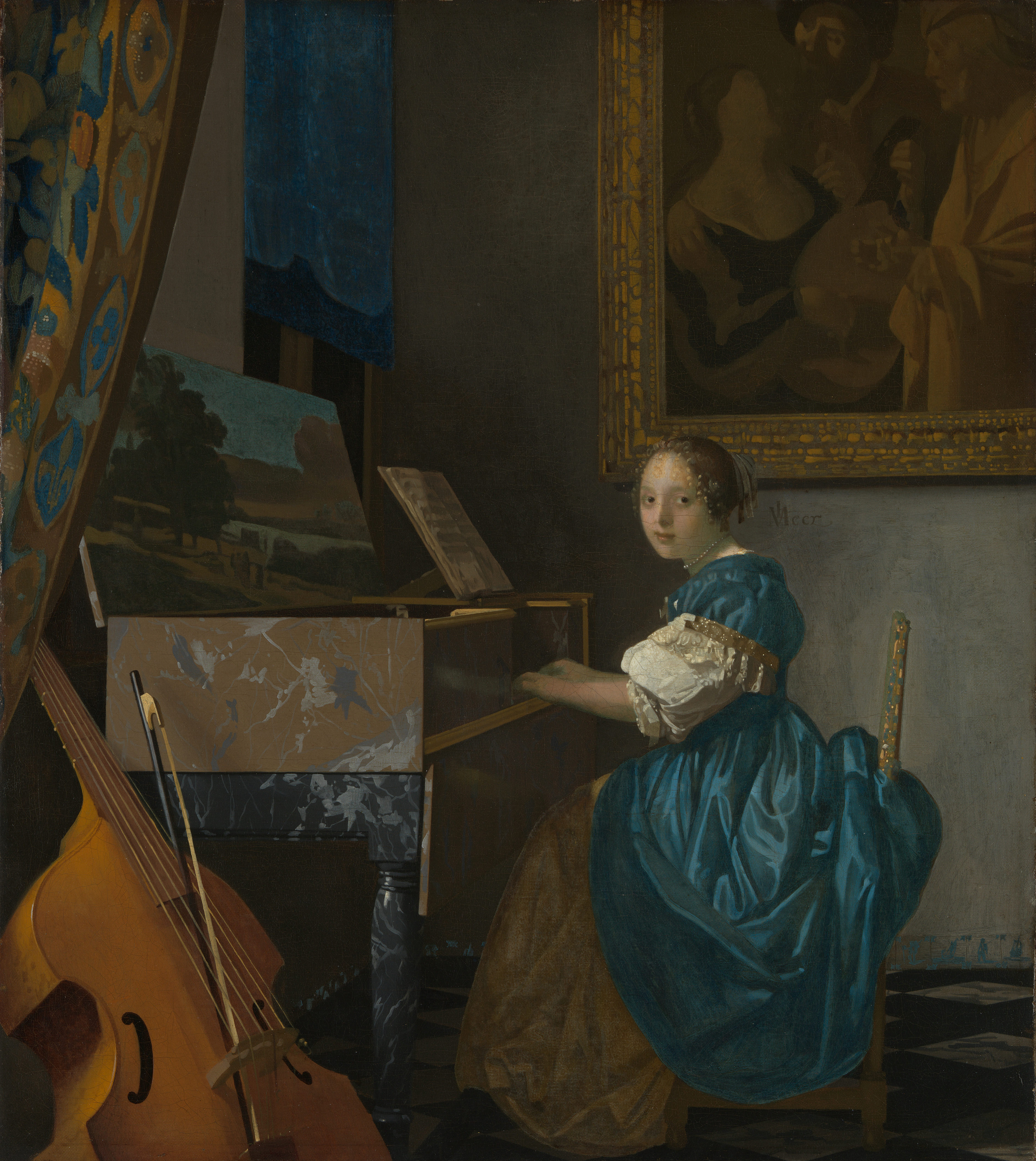
Lady Seated at a Virginal (c. 1670–1672), National Gallery in London
