= Cornelis van der Meulen =

Dutch painter

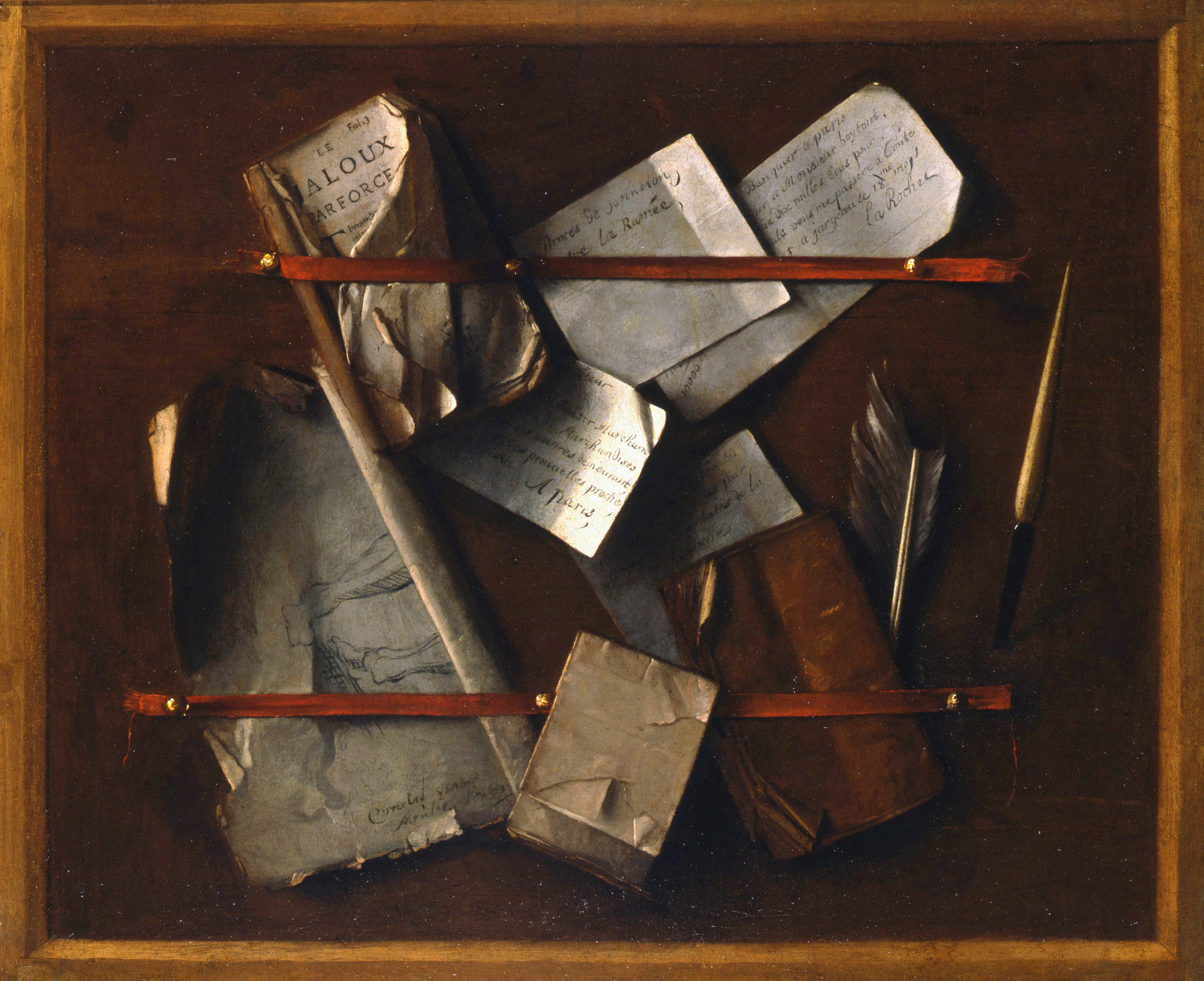
Trompe-l'œil with letter rack

Cornelis van der Meulen or Cornelis Vermeulen (1642, Dordrecht – 1691, Stockholm), was a Dutch painter who after training in the Dutch Republic had a career in Sweden where he became a court painter. He is known for still lifes of flowers and game, trompe-l'œil and vanitas still lifes, topographical views and portraits.

== Life ==
He was born in Dortrecht where he was baptized on 5 September 1642. His parents were Cornelis Adriaensz. van der Meulen, a cloth maker, and Helena Gijsbrecht van der Spiegel. In the late 1650s, he was a pupil of Samuel van Hoogstraten in his hometown. Samuel van Hoogstraten was a painter who practised in many genres and had been a pupil of Rembrandt. Van Hoogstraten set van der Meulen in the direction of the painting of trompe-l'œil still lifes.

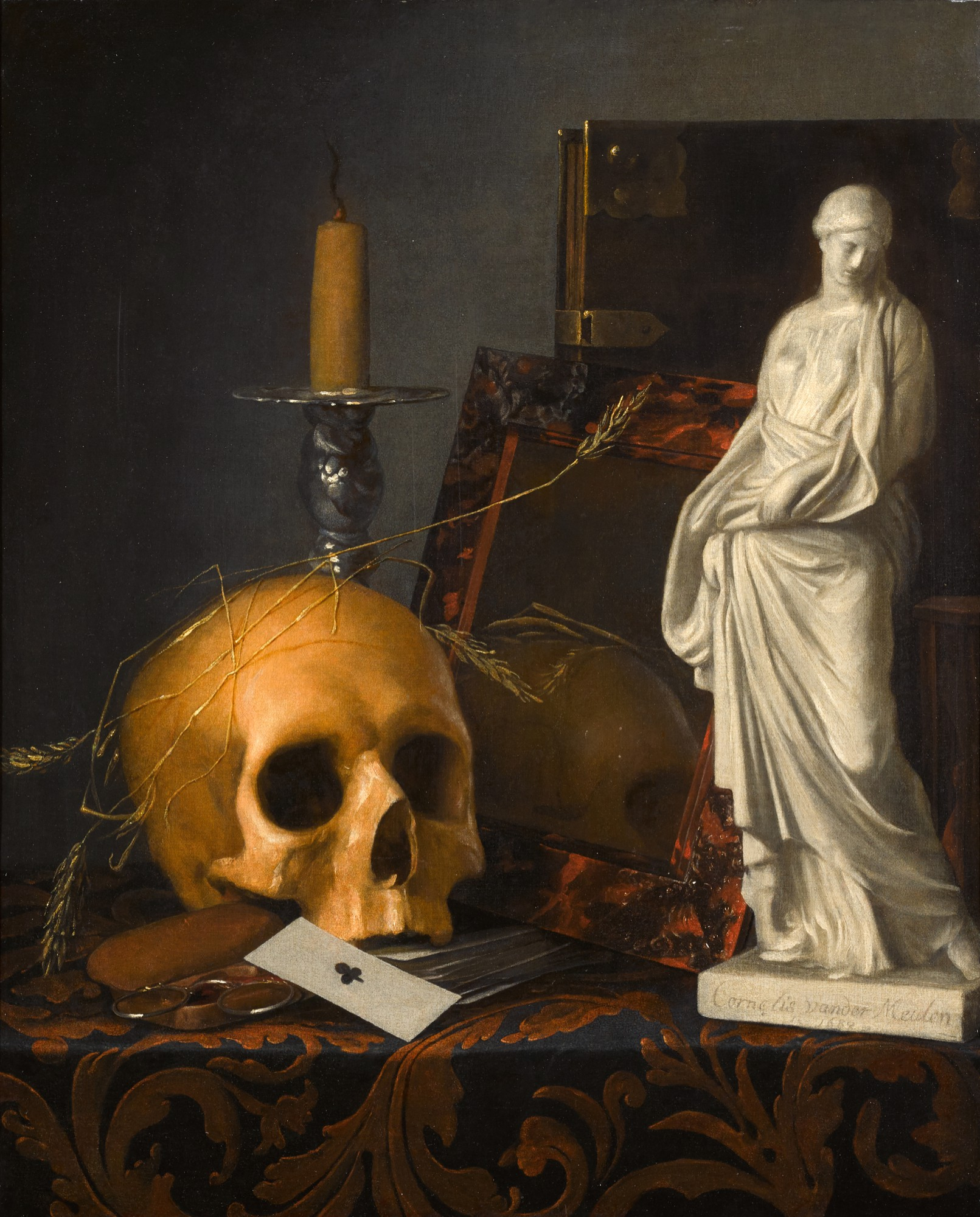
Vanitas still life with a skull etc.

It is possible that he traveled to Italy and spent time in Rome since his Vanitas still life (Sotheby's sale of 10 May 2019, London, lot 287) includes a statuette of Saint Susanna, which is based on a sculpture by the Flemish sculptor François Duquesnoy. As this sculpture was located on the altar of Santa Maria di Loreto, Rome and was little known until the 18th century, it seems probable that van der Meulen can only have known the statuette if he had seen it personally in Rome.

He probably arrived in Stockholm some time in the first half of 1678. In the next year he appeared as a member on the register of the Stockholm painters' guild. He painted vanitas still lifes and a still lifes with musical instruments for Ericsberg Palace in Sodermanland. The Swedish still life painter Christian von Thum is mentioned as his master in some sources. In 1683 he was commissioned to assist with the decoration of Drottningholm Palace, the private residence of the Swedish royal family.

He died in Stockholm where he was buried on 5 January 1692.

== Work ==
=== General ===
Van der Meulen's known oeuvre consists of a limited number of works, most of which were created during his stay in Sweden and are kept in Swedish museums and collections. Most of these works are still lifes. The subjects of his still life paintings are trompe-l'œil, vanitas, flower pieces and game pieces. He also created a topographical view of Stockholm.

=== Trompe-l'œil still lifes ===
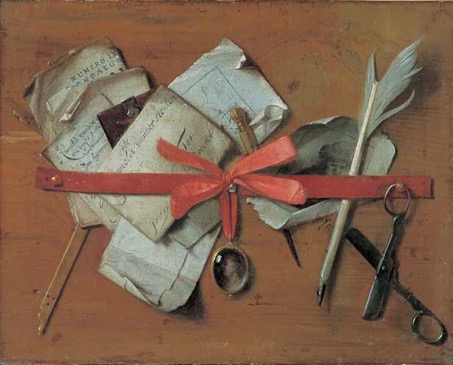
Trompe-l'œil stil life of a letter rack

Van der Meulen's master Samuel van Hoogstraten contributed to the use of illusionistic effects such as trompe-l'œil in Dutch painting. He was in particular one of the first to paint so-called quod‐libet still‐lifes, which are illusionistically rendered wooden surfaces on which various disparate objects are pinned by means of a ribbon. The objects range from letters to other trifles such as scissors, quill pens, portrait miniatures, prints, etc. The Flemish painter Cornelis Norbertus Gysbrechts was the first to introduce this type of painting into Sweden. While working as a court painter in Denmark Gysbrechts spent the winter of 1673–74 in Stockholm. Here he created a quod-libet still‐life commissioned by the burgesses of Stockholm as a gift to Claes Rålamb, the governor of the city.

Cornelis van der Meulen further developed quod-libet still‐lifes in Sweden. The Trompe-l'œil still life of a letter rack (Stockholm, Royal Collections Sweden) may be identical with the work referred to as The little letter, which is mentioned in the Royal Stockholm Paintings Office's minutes from 1679. Cornelis van der Meulen's earliest completed painting in Sweden is likely the painting referred to as The Little Letter, which is mentioned in the Stockholm Paintings Office's minutes in the year 1679. It is a quod-libet composition of a traditional kind in which a collection of letters, drawings and cutlery is scattered over a board wall. The painting can be regarded as an intellectual self‐portrait, as it shows letters addressed to the artist together with implements from the artist's trade such as a quill pen, a print, a burin etc. Some objects may carry a symbolic meaning. For instance, the scissors may refer to the fragility of human life. A miniature hanging on the board from a pink silk ribbon contains a women's portrait in profile in an oval. It gives the work a personal touch. One of the letters pinned to the board carries the words "Cornelis van der Meulen Schilder tot Dordrecht" (Cornelis van der Meulen Painter from Dordrecht). This indicates that perhaps the painting was a work he created while still in Dortrecht and showed as a masterwork to be accepted by the guild of Stockholm.

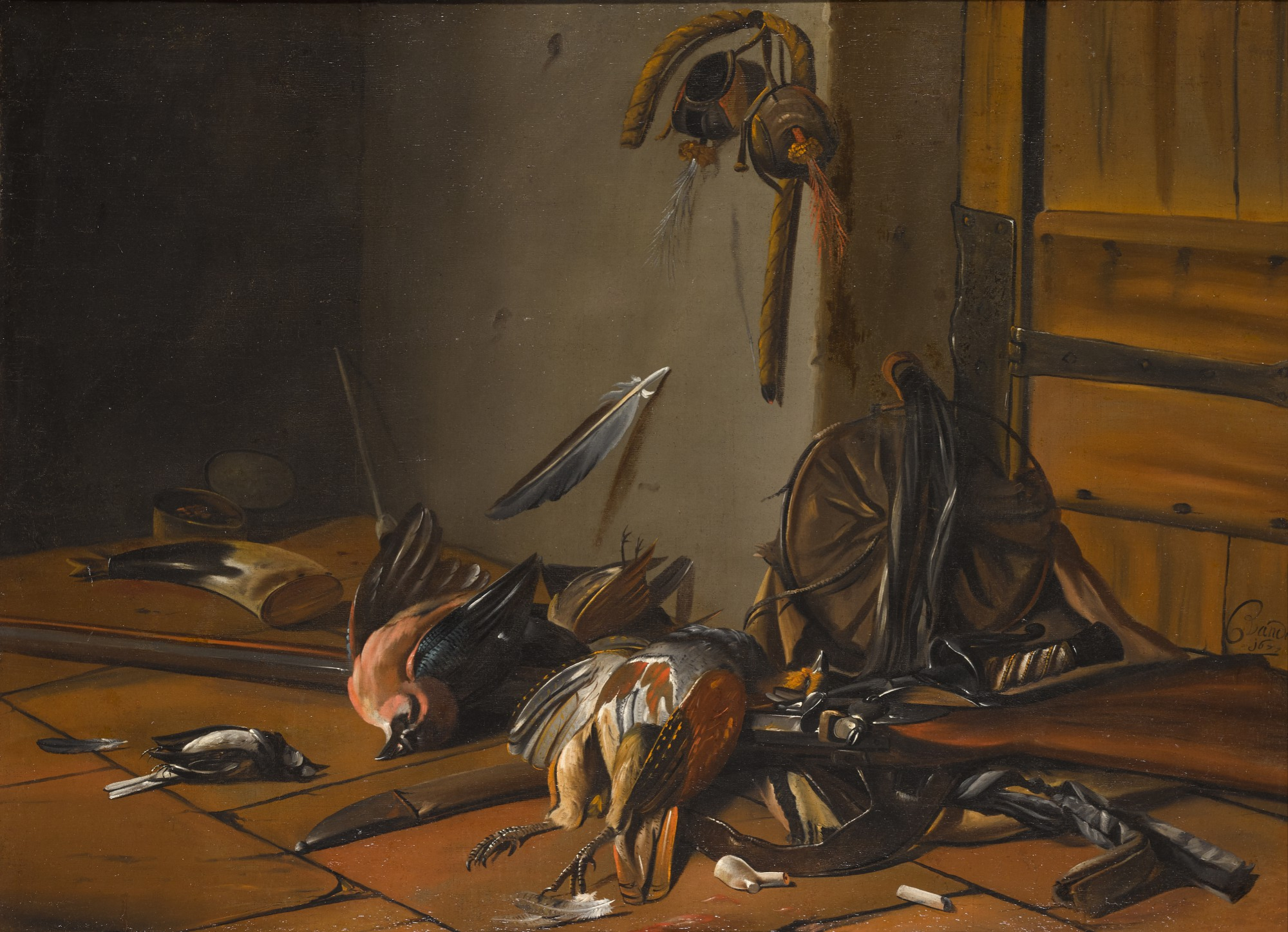
Still life with birds and hunting equipment in an interior

=== Vanitas still lifes ===
Many of van der Meulen are vanitas still lifes, a type of still lifes which evokes the meaninglessness of worldly aspirations and the transient nature of all human endeavors. This vanitas motif drew its inspiration from the Christian view that the world is solely a temporary place of fleeting pleasures and sorrows from which humans' sole escape route is through the sacrifice and resurrection of Jesus. This meaning is conveyed in these still lifes through the use of stock symbols, which reference the transience of things and, in particular, the futility of earthly wealth: a skull, soap bubbles, candles, empty glasses, wilting flowers, insects, smoke, watches, mirrors, books, hourglasses and musical instruments, various expensive or exclusive objects such as jewellery and rare shells. The term vanitas is derived from the famous line 'Vanitas, Vanitas. Et omnia Vanitas', in the book of the Ecclesiastes in the bible, which in the King James Version is translated as "Vanity of vanities, all is vanity". While most of these symbols reference the transience of life and death (soap bubbles, candles, skulls) and human pursuits (scientific instruments, music, books, etc.), some carry a dual meaning: a rose refers as much to the brevity of living things as it is a symbol of the resurrection of Christ and thus eternal life.

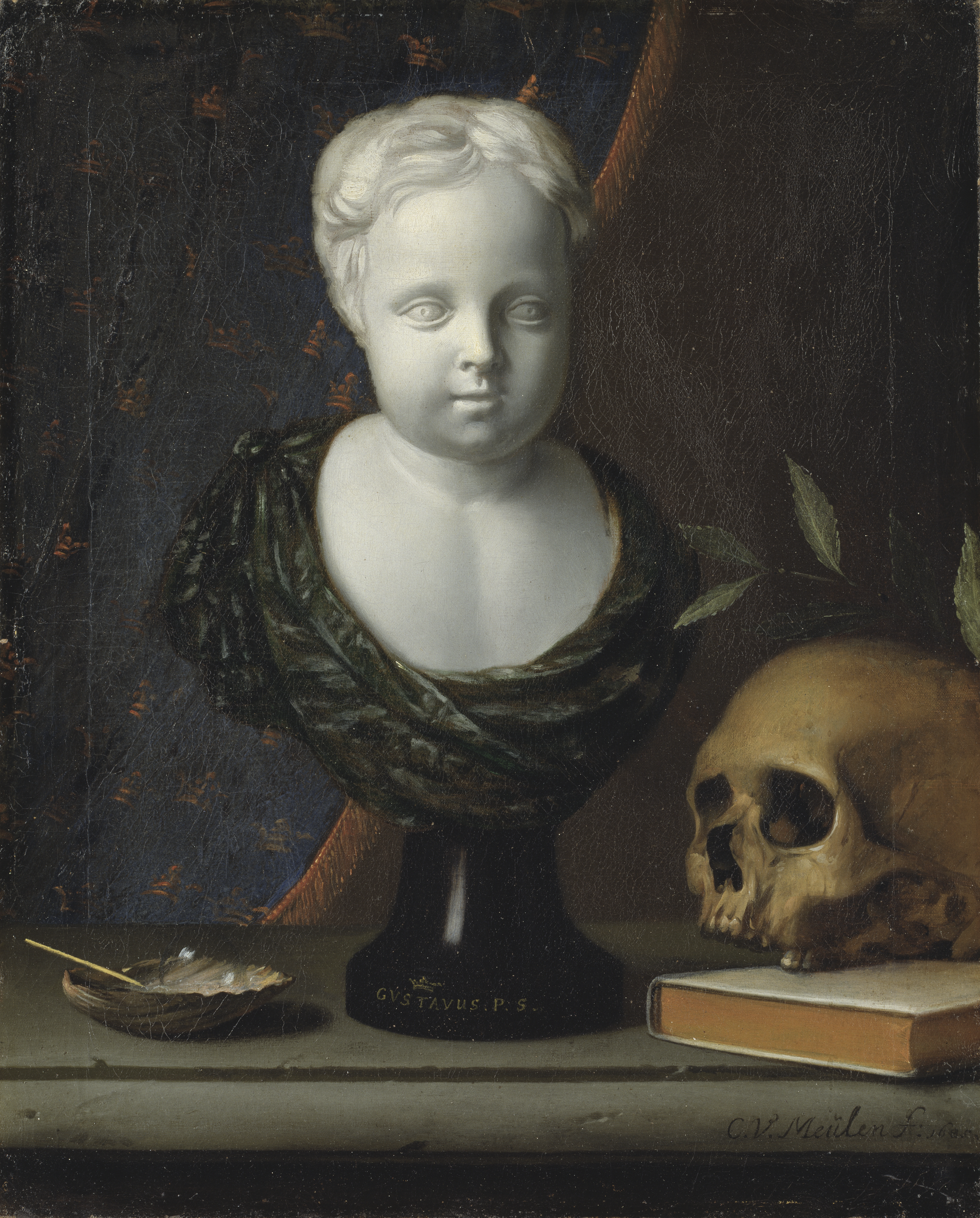
Portrait of Prince Gustav of Sweden

A typical vanitas still life by van der Meulen is the Vanitas still life with a skull, a guttering candle, a tortoiseshell mirror, a book, a statuette of saint Susanna, and a pack of cards (Sotheby's sale of 10 May 2019, London, lot 287). It contains many of the typical symbols of vanitas paintings. The statue of Saint Susanna, a Christian martyr, symbolises the Christian conviction that it is possible to find salvation in death through the force of a steadfast faith in Christ's. He also painted some vanitas still lifes with musical instruments which bring to mind the Northern Italian instrument painting in the circle around Evaristo Baschenis.

Two extraordinary vanitas still lifes are the portraits of Ulrik and Gustav both princes of Sweden and sons of King Karl XI, who had died as toddlers. The portraits of the two princes are in the form of bust sculptures, which were derived from the posthumous marble portrait busts of the princes made by the Flemish sculptor Nicolaes Millich. Millich had made the busts for the princes' grandmother, the queen dowager Hedwig Eleonora of Holstein-Gottorp. The queen dowager appreciated these sculpted portrait busts of her deceased grandsons Gustav and Ulrik. Van der Meulen incorporated them using a trompe-l'œil effect into the two vanitas still life paintings which were then hung in their grandmother's prayer room. Van der Meulen has added vanitas symbols to the bust portraits (books, a skull with laurel leaves, a seashell, a broken rose and a soap bubble). The busts of the princes also resemble Roman busts of child emperors and thus refer back to the royal lineage and authority of the children. This is further emphasized in the portrait of Gustav which has a Swedish flag with the royal crowns as its backdrop.

The contemporary fame of van der Meulen as a vanitas painter seems to be confirmed by the fact that the Delft painter Johannes Vermeer is believed to have used a vanitas still life with a violin by van der Meulen's hand in the background of his A Lady Writing a Letter.

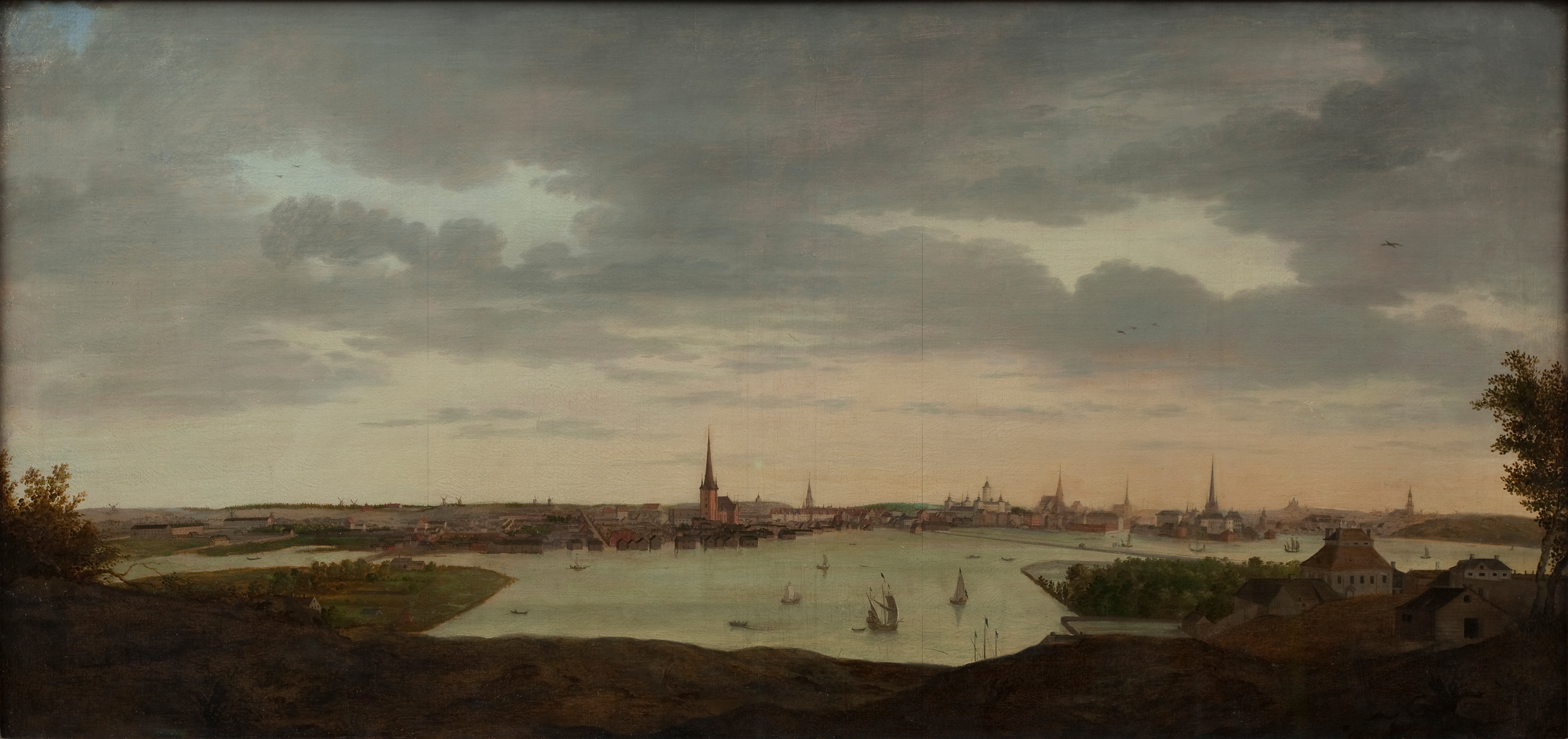
View of Stockholm

=== View of Stockholm ===
An outlier in van der Meulen's oeuvre is the panoramic view of Stockholm (c. 1690, Stockholm City Museum). It is likely that he used a camera obscura in the production of the painting. The view is taken from the Kungsklippan at Kungsholmen. The city is shown resting in a warm evening light. The lake in the front of the picture is Klara lake. On the rural outskirts of the city are the Tukthuset (an orphanage) and the General Children's House. These are the large white buildings that can be seen just to the left of the bridge at Drottningatan. Here at Norrmalm, on Johannesgatan, was also the care facility Drottninghuset ('Queen's House'). The church in the middle of the painting that rises above the landscape is Klara Church. A row of newly built noble palaces along Drottninggatan (Queen's Street) stand out on the right of the church.
