= Burchard Precht =

German sculptor

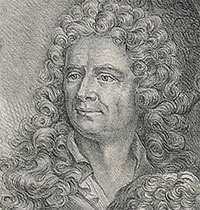
- Burchard Precht
- Born: Burchard Precht; 24 October 1651; Bremen, Holy Roman Empire
- Died: 1738; Stockholm, Sweden
- Children: Son Christian Precht

Burchard Precht (24 October 1651 – 26 February 1738) was a Swedish-German furniture maker and sculptor. He is best known for his contributions to Stockholm Cathedral and Uppsala Cathedral; he designed the altarpiece for Uppsala in 1728. Precht and his workshop also created other church furnishings, including epitaphs, and a large amount of furniture, primarily gilded tables, guéridons and ornamental frames for mirrors and pictures.

== Early life and career ==
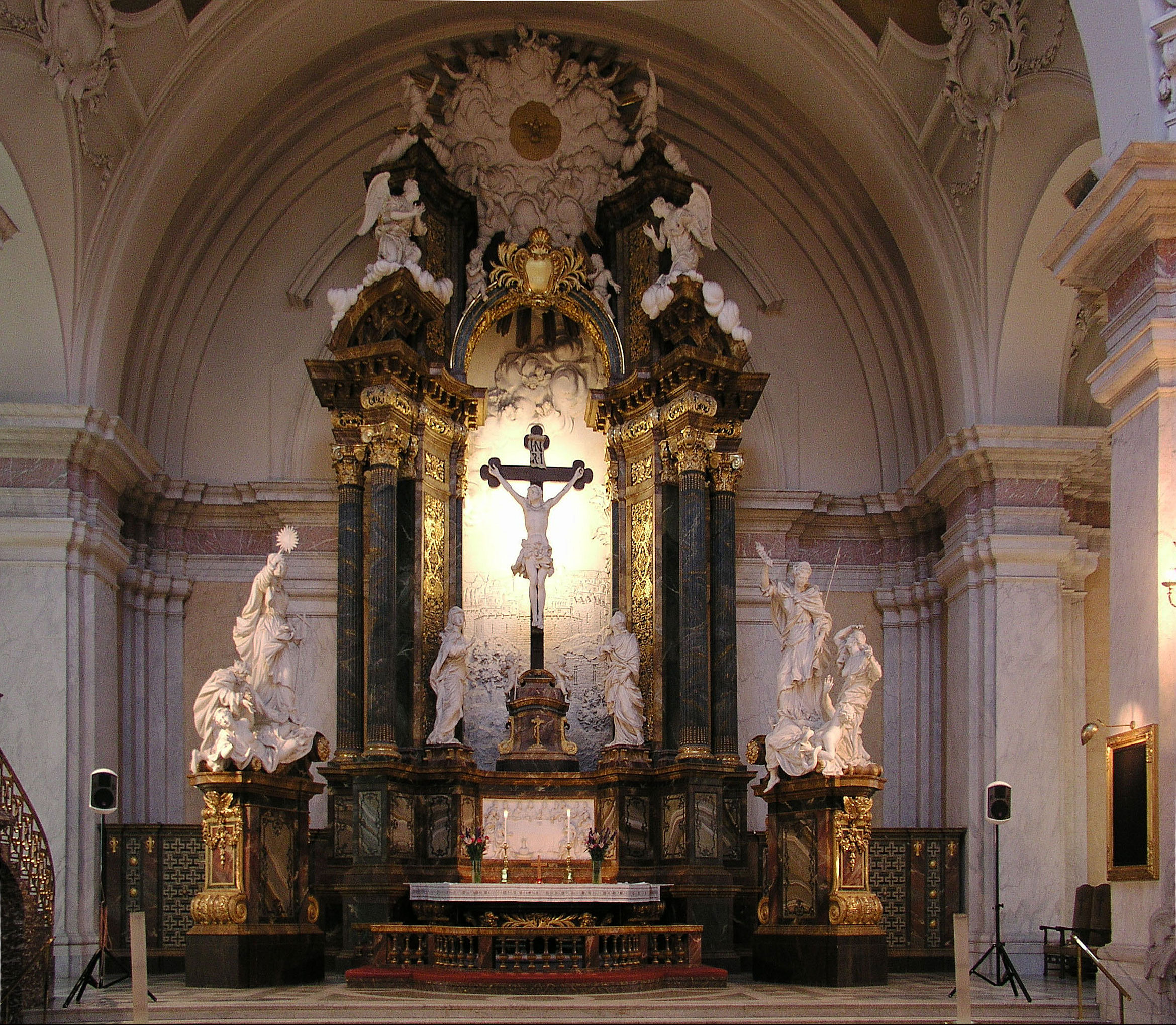
The former altarpiece of Uppsala Cathedral, currently in Gustaf Vasa Church, Stockholm

Precht was born in 1651 in Bremen, Germany. His father was a sculptor and so was his elder brother Christian Precht, to whom he was apprenticed in Hamburg in 1666, who was also a wood carver who had worked on the organ of St. Jacobi in Hamburg.

In 1672, he went to Sweden at the suggestion of Nicolaes Millich, who was assisting in the decoration of Drottningholm Palace. He associated with Herman Buck in the Storkyrkan in Stockholm and both had similar baroque styles of carving sculptures on the organ. Precht's contributions to the palace were mostly carved ornamentation, for example in the "Dowager Queen's Alcove". He also executed such items as guéridons, frames for mirrors and pictures, and tables. In 1681 he became court sculptor. Six years later, he followed Nicodemus Tessin the Younger to France and Italy to make studies preparing for the planned redevelopment of Tre Kronor Castle in Stockholm into a palace. Precht's 1684 carving for Storkyrkan's Royal Pew was to a design by Tessin the Younger. After his return he decorated the new chapel and several other rooms, all of which were lost when the palace burned down in 1697. Together with Tessin, Precht introduced the gilded Baroque style to Sweden.

Precht established a studio which produced a large number of church fittings for more than fifty years, and which continued to be influential for most of the 18th century. An example of his work is the sarcophagus of Gustaf Kruus in the Sätuna crypt in Björklinge church, created in 1692. Executing designs by Tessin, Precht furnished a large number of churches, including the royal pews and pulpits in Stockholm Cathedral (in 1684 and 1701), when he worked with Herman Buck; and Uppsala Cathedral (1709). He created the altarpiece for Uppsala Cathedral (1728), which was moved to the Gustaf Vasa Church in Stockholm in 1906. This 15 metres (49 ft) high baroque style altar was built by Precht in his workshop between 1728 and 1731. The pulpit at this cathedral was a gift by Queen Dowager Hedvig Eleonora as the earlier one had been destroyed by fire in 1702. It was then the largest in Sweden where high mass was held on Sundays. Precht and his workshop also created other church furnishings, including epitaphs, and a large amount of furniture, primarily gilded tables, guéridons and ornamental frames for mirrors and pictures. His studio also produced mirrors and frames. He delivered a pair of marble busts for Stockholm Castle in 1690, and also created marble statues for the royal stables on the island of Helgeandsholmen.

Precht's professional career made him the most prominent sculptor in Sweden during the 17th and early 18th centuries. His techniques of construction and aspects such as artistic presentation with a smooth surface finish seen in the altar in Gustaf Vasa Church are also noted in Germany and Austria.

== Personal life ==
His son Christian Precht (1706–1779) was a silversmith and designer of china patterns who is credited with introducing Rococo style to Sweden. Precht died in 1738 in Stockholm, Sweden. A medal was struck in his honour in the same year.
