= Nicolaes Millich =

Flemish sculptor, architect and designer

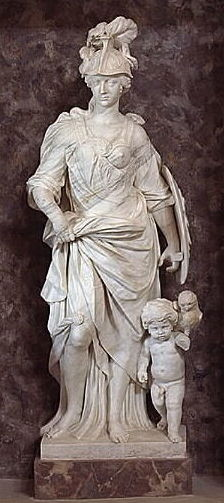
- Minerva by Millich in Drottningholm Palace hall
- Born: 1629, Antwerp
- Died: c. 1699, Stockholm
- Known for: Sculpture and architecture
- Notable work: Sculptures of the staircase and hall of Drottningholm Palace
- Patron(s): Magnus Gabriel de la Gardie, Hedwig Eleonora of Holstein-Gottorp

Nicolaes Millich or Nicholas Millich (1629–c. 1699) was a Flemish sculptor, architect and designer of armor and ephemeral objects. He worked for most of his career in Sweden. He was court sculptor to king Charles X Gustav of Sweden and later worked for the king's widow Hedwig Eleonora of Holstein-Gottorp. His main creation in Sweden was the execution of the sculptural programme of the staircase and hall of Drottningholm Palace, the private residence of the Swedish royal family. He also worked on various grave monuments and epitaphs of prominent Swedes.

== Life ==
He was born in Antwerp where he was baptized on 5 June 1629. His parents were the merchant Antonius Michill and Susan De Poorter. He is recorded in the period 1653–54 in Brussels as a pupil of the local master Nicolaas Stercx. He was registered as a master sculptor in Antwerp's Guild of Saint Luke in the guild year 1657–58. He was registered in Antwerp until the guild year 1663–1664 when he is recorded as having a pupil. In the years 1664 and 1665 he is in Amsterdam where he assisted the Flemish sculptor Rombout Verhulst with the execution of sculptures in the City Hall.

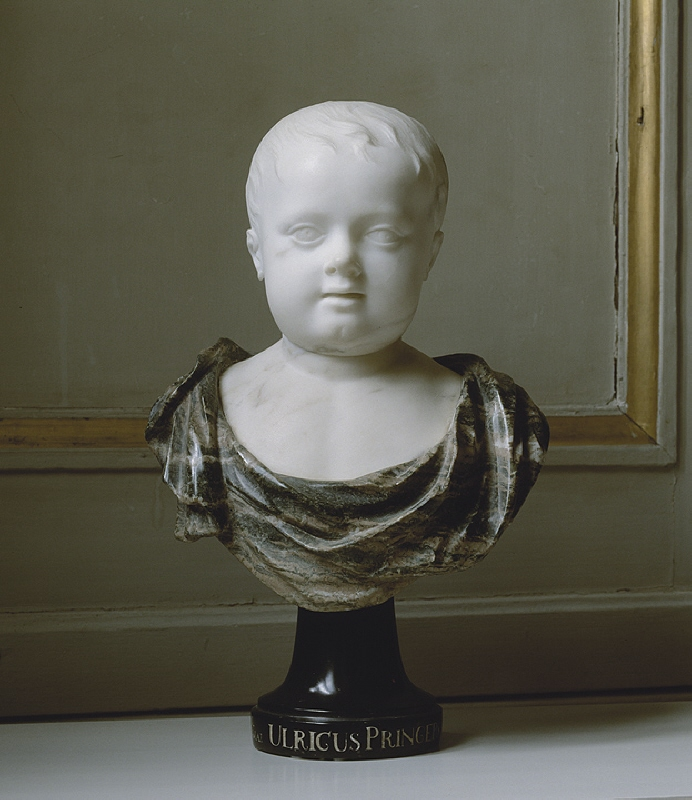
Portrait bust of Prince Ulrik of Sweden

He moved to Sweden in August 1669 on the recommendation of the Swedish resident in The Hague, Johann Philip Silfvercrona. He stayed in Sweden until 1676 and became a court sculptor to the King. In 1673 he obtained a privilege at the marble quarry of Kolmården. The next year he was appointed the royal inspector of the marble quarries in Sweden. He was in 1676 in Tallinn working on an epitaph and other works in the St. Mary's Cathedral.

He is recorded back in Antwerp on 16 June 1679 as a witness to a notarial deed. In 1680 he was commissioned in Antwerp to make the design for the new tower of the St. Paul's Church in Antwerp, after the old one was destroyed in a fire.

He returned to Sweden in 1683 where he stayed until 1687. During this time he was employed at the Drottningholm Palace, the private residence of the Swedish royal family. He is again recorded in Stockholm in the period between 1682 and 1699. He was appointed court sculptor. After 1687 there is no mention of him in Stockholm, probably due to problems between him and Nicodemus Tessin the Younger, the court architect. It is possibly that he had then left Sweden temporarily.

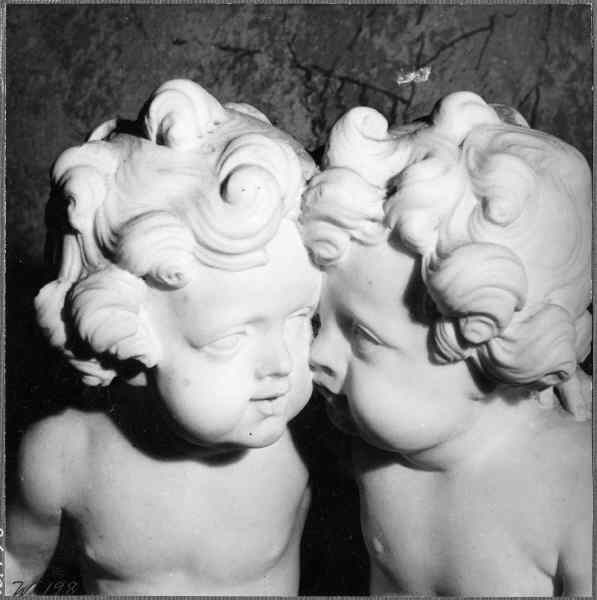
Detail of Knut Kurck's tomb monument

It is believed that he died in Stockholm in 1699.

His pupils in Antwerp included Jan Baptist Smesters and Jacob Wouters. The sculptor Abraham-César Lamoureux was his apprentice in Stockholm around 1670.

== Work ==
Millich was sculptor, architect and designer of armor, festivals, furniture, lamps and ephemeral objects such as cake. He worked in both stone and wood. The skill in the latter enabled him to complete assignments for smaller objects such as frames for paintings by David Klöcker Ehrenstrahl, wig stands, glove forms and board game trays. Millich was an eclectic artist who worked mainly in the Palladian classicist style that had been promoted by the Flemish sculptor Artus Quellinus the Elder who had created the sculptural programme for the large city hall building in Amsterdam. Millich had also worked on this project in Amsterdam under the direction of Rombout Verhulst. During a visit to his homeland in around the 1680s, he was confronted with the new style which was then the rage in Flemish sculpture: the high Baroque followed the Italian artist Gian Lorenzo Bernini's extravagant style. Millich tried to adapt to this new style with moderate success. He was a well-trained and skillful master with a wide range rather than a brilliant talent.

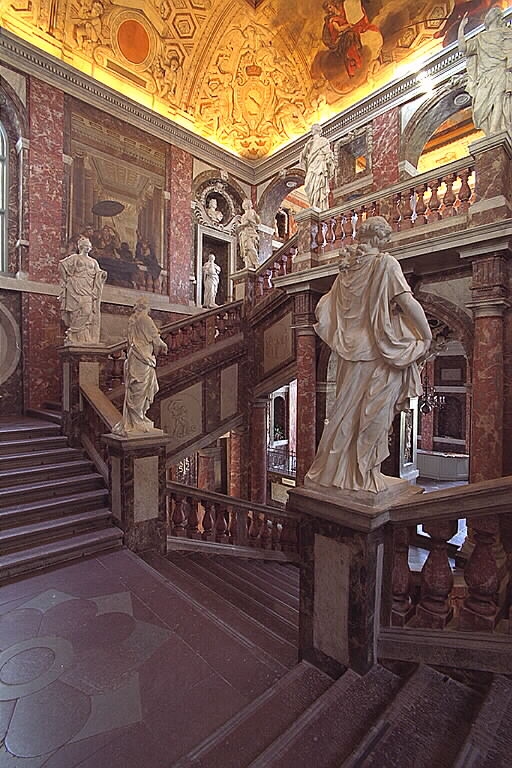
Drottningholm Palace staircase

Millich's most notable work were the statue carvings decorating the staircase and hall of Drottningholm Palace. For the large staircase in marble he created, partially in Sweden and partially in Antwerp, a series of statues of Apollo, Minerva and the nine Muses, together with a series of busts of Gothic kings. In addition, he also made bust portraits of King Charles X Gustav, his wife Hedwig Eleonor and both their sons, the young King Charles XI, probably also of Magnus Gabriel De la Gardie and his wife Maria Euphrosyne, a sister of King Charles X Gustav. He also worked on the decorative wood carvings in the queen dowager's bed chamber, in collaboration with his assistant Burchard Precht.

He worked often as a portrait artist. He portrayed living and deceased members of the royal family as stand-alone works or as part of the tomb monuments on which he worked. His style is realistic. The same realism is also present in his purely vegetative decorations. The queen dowager appreciated his portrait busts of her deceased grandsons Gustav and Ulrik. These were later incorporated in two vanitas still life paintings by the Dutch artist Cornelis van der Meulen which hung in their grandmother's prayer room.

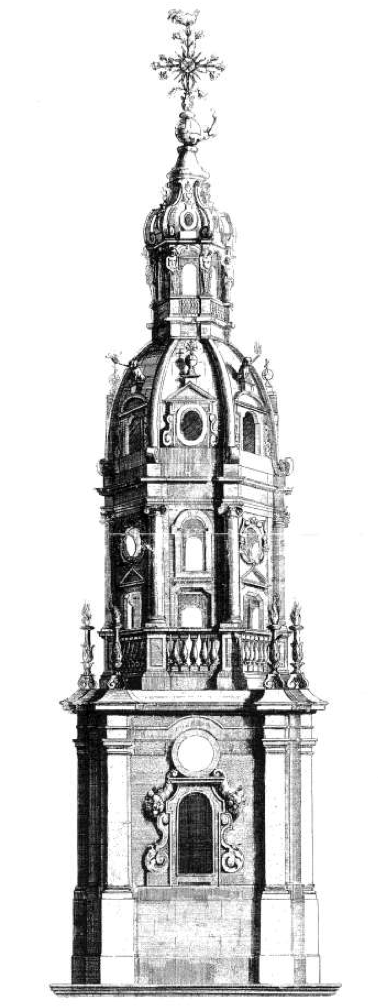
Design of tower of the St. Paul's Church in Antwerp

Millich executed a number of tomb monuments and epitaphs in Sweden and Estonia. For the Imperial Councillor Erik Flemming he produced an epitaph in black and white marble in the church of Sorunda in Södertörn. It includes busts of the deceased and his two spouses, six putti and statues representing faith and justice. Other tomb monuments included the monuments for Bielkenstierna, Knut Kurck, Gustav Bonde. On some of these works he collaborated with his pupil Abraham Caesar Lamoureux.

It is not clear why Millich was selected to design the new tower of the St. Paul's Church in Antwerp when he was back in Antwerp around 1680. He designed a Baroque tower top with an octagonal superstructure, which ends with a small lantern turret. The upward lines of this lantern turret consist of herma statues with naked male torsos that look like functional caryatides. The dome of the lantern turret consists mainly of eight volutes that come together at the top. Originally Millich designed four dogs with a torch to sit on top the lantern dome, with another dog running around the globe beneath the cross, functioning thus as an extra wind vane.
