= A Lady Writing a Letter =

Painting by Johannes Vermeer c. 1665

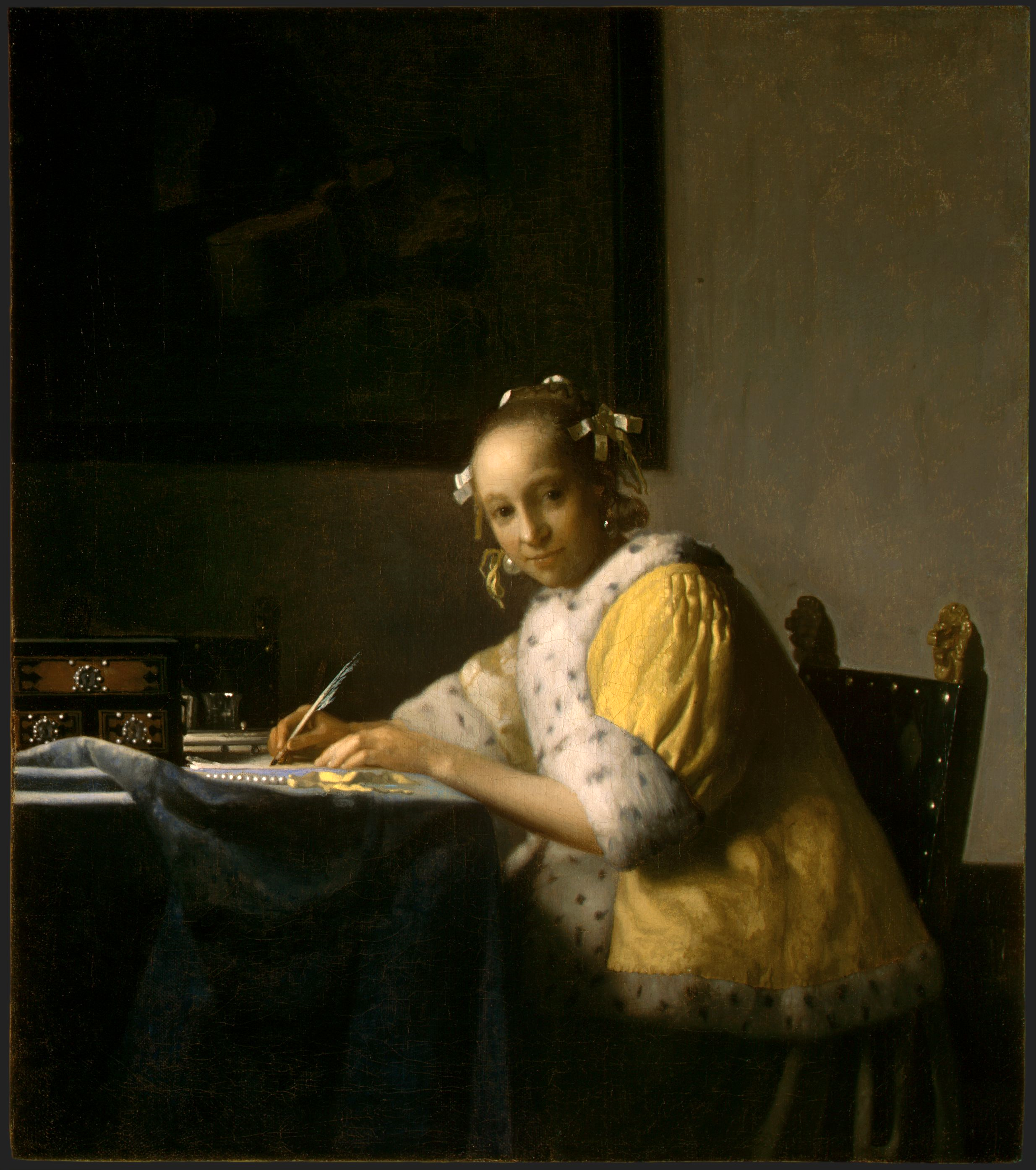
- Artist: Johannes Vermeer
- Year: c. 1665
- Medium: Oil on canvas
- Movement: Dutch Golden Age painting
- Dimensions: 45 cm × 39.9 cm (18 in × 15.7 in)
- Location: National Gallery of Art; Washington, D.C.

A Lady Writing a Letter (also known as A Lady Writing) is an oil on canvas painting by the 17th century Dutch painter Johannes Vermeer. It is believed to have been completed by artist during his mature phase, in the mid-to-late 1660s. The work is in the collection of the National Gallery of Art in Washington, D.C.

== Description of the scene ==
The lady in the painting is shown writing a letter while sitting at a table in a room. She appears to have been interrupted, as she has turned her head away from the letter to look towards the viewer, while she continues to hold the quill in her right hand. She is dressed elegantly in a lemon-yellow morning jacket and wears a necklace with ten pearls and two pearl earrings. The number of compositional elements in the painting are limited and the focus is the woman's figure and the sparse objects in the woman and the table are brought near to the picture plane, which emphasizes the directness of her gaze. All small objects in the painting are placed on the table. This concentration of small forms stand in contrasts with the large forms used in the rest of the composition, which create a geometric framework for the figure.

On the back of the wall is a painting, which covers two-thirds of the width of the composition. The painting of which only a part is shown in the picture depicts a large string instrument, probably a violone. It is known from the inventory of Vermeer's estate that he owned a vanitas still life with a double bass and skull. Based on a comparison of the depicted work and its description in the inventory of Vermeer's estate with the known vanitas still lifes of the Dutch painter Cornelis van der Meulen it is likely that the painting on the wall is by van der Meulen's hand. Vanitas paintings were popular in the Dutch Republic. They aim to evoke the meaninglessness of worldly aspirations and the transient nature of all human endeavors often by contrasting symbols of death and decay with luxurious objects or other items which relate to worldly success. Vermeer's intention in including a vanitas painting in a rich interior with an elegantly dressed lady was likely to convey this philosophical vanitas message that all worldly possessions and achievements are ultimately doomed to fail and end in death.

Many of the objects seen in the painting, such as the woman's coat, the cloth on the table, and the string of pearls, also appear in other Vermeer works. This has led to speculation that he or his family members owned the objects, and even that the subjects of the paintings are his relatives. It has often been suggested that in his paintings, Vermeer sought to depict in his models that which he could not give to his wife and family: calm and affluence.

== History of the painting ==
Like many other paintings by Vermeer, the painting was made for his patron Pieter van Ruijven (1624–1674). From him it passed possibly by inheritance to his wife, Maria de Knuijt [died 1681]. From her it then possibly passed by inheritance to her daughter, Magdalena van Ruijven and from her possibly by inheritance to her husband, Jacobus Abrahamsz. Dissius. After his death the work was auctioned in Amsterdam on 16 May 1696. Until the early nineteenth century, the work remained in the hands of several Dutch owners until it was bought in 1827 by the Belgian politician François de Robiano (1778–1836) in whose family it remained until it was bought in 1907 by the American banker John Pierpont Morgan (1837–1913). In 1946 the American art collector Horace Havemeyer (1886–1956) acquired the work. Harry Waldron Havemeyer and Horace Havemeyer donated the work to the National Gallery of Art in 1962.

== See also ==
- List of paintings by Johannes Vermeer

== Sources ==
- Bonafoux, Pascal. Vermeer. New York: Konecky & Konecky, 1992. ISBN 1-56852-308-4
- Critical info by Peter Sutton
