= Drottningholm Palace =

Royal palace in Stockholm, Sweden

- Drottningholms slott
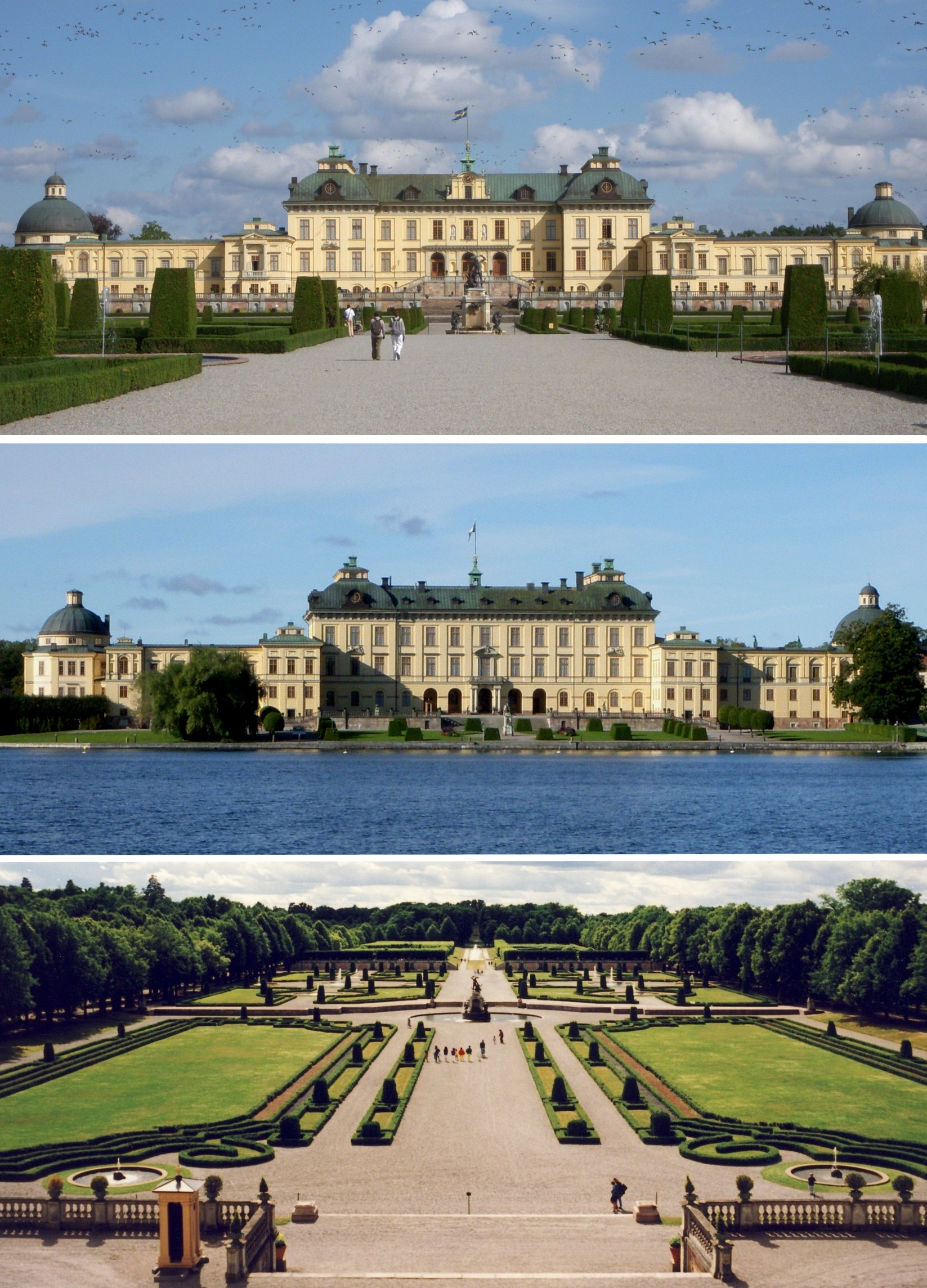

- Location within Stockholm

General information
- Location: Drottningholm, Sweden
- Coordinates: 59°19′18″N 017°53′10″E
- Construction started: 1662

UNESCO World Heritage Site
- Official name: Part of the Royal Domain of Drottningholm
- Type: Cultural
- Criteria: iv
- Designated: 1991 (15th session)
- Reference no.: 559
- Region: Europe and North America

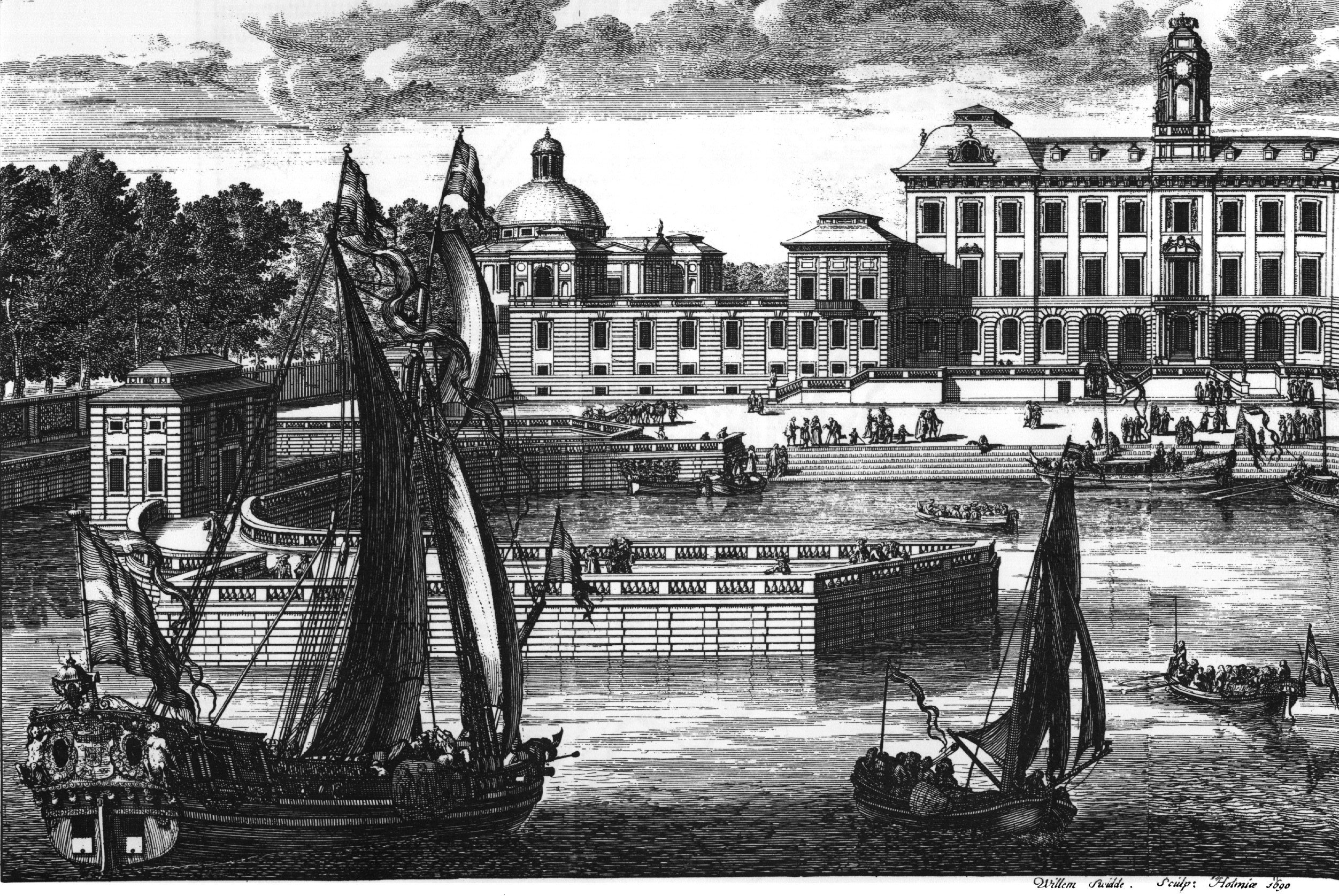
Engraving of Drottningholm Palace, c. 1700

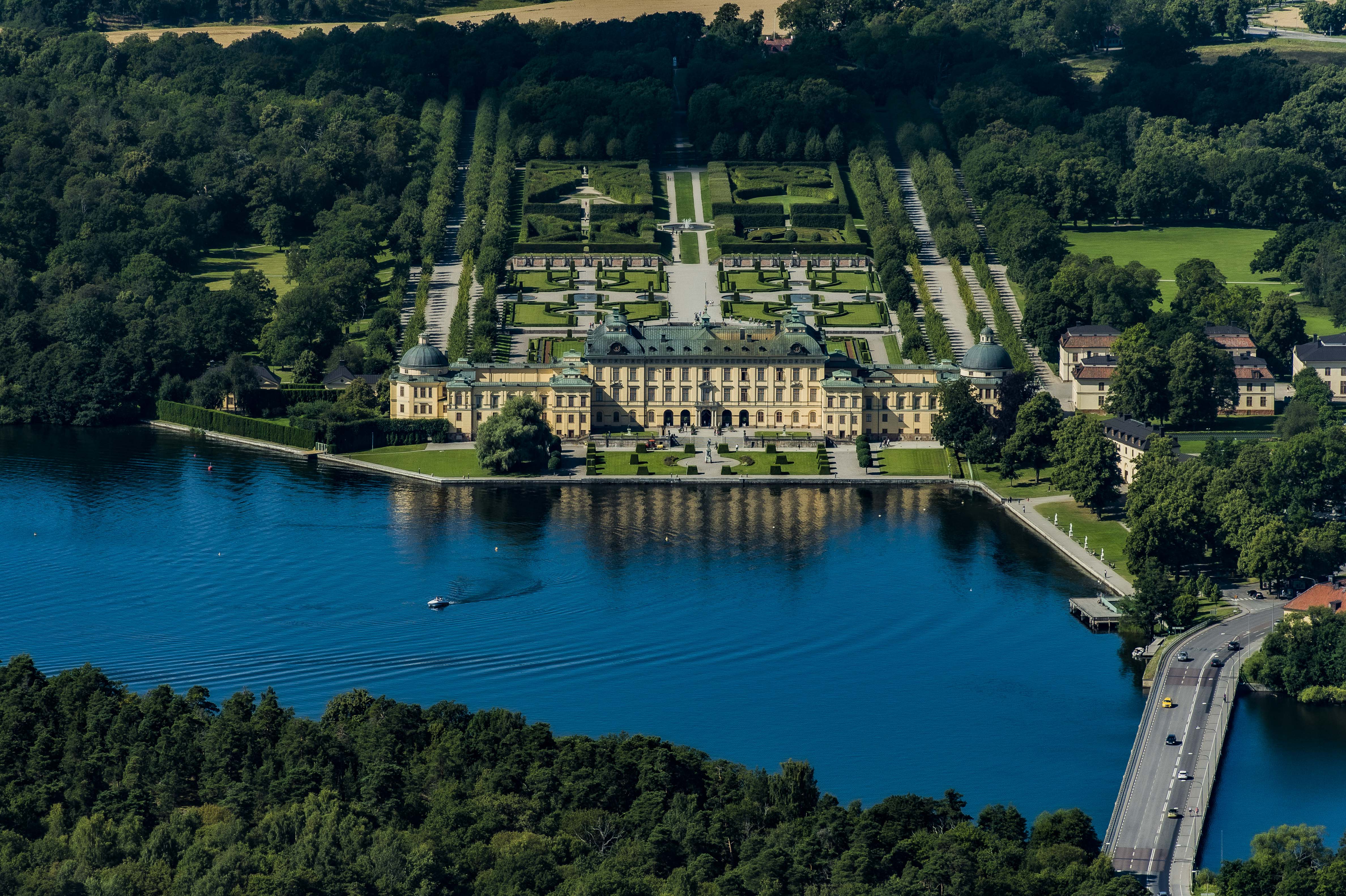
Aerial view over Drottningholms slott.

Drottningholm Palace (Swedish: Drottningholms slott) is a royal palace in Drottningholm, on the island of Lovön in Ekerö Municipality, Stockholm County, Sweden. Built beginning in 1662, it served as a regular summer residence of the Swedish royal court during much of the 18th century and is today the residence of the Swedish royal family.

The palace is part of the Royal Domain of Drottningholm, which was inscribed on the UNESCO World Heritage List in 1991 under criterion (iv). The designated property also encompasses the Drottningholm Palace Theatre, the Chinese Pavilion, the palace gardens, and other parts of the surrounding royal domain.

Drottningholm Palace is open to the public and is a major tourist attraction.

== History ==
=== Origin ===
The name Drottningholm (literally meaning "Queen's islet") came from the original renaissance building designed by Willem Boy, a stone palace built by John III of Sweden in 1580 for his queen, Catherine Jagiellon. This palace was preceded by a royal mansion called Torvesund.

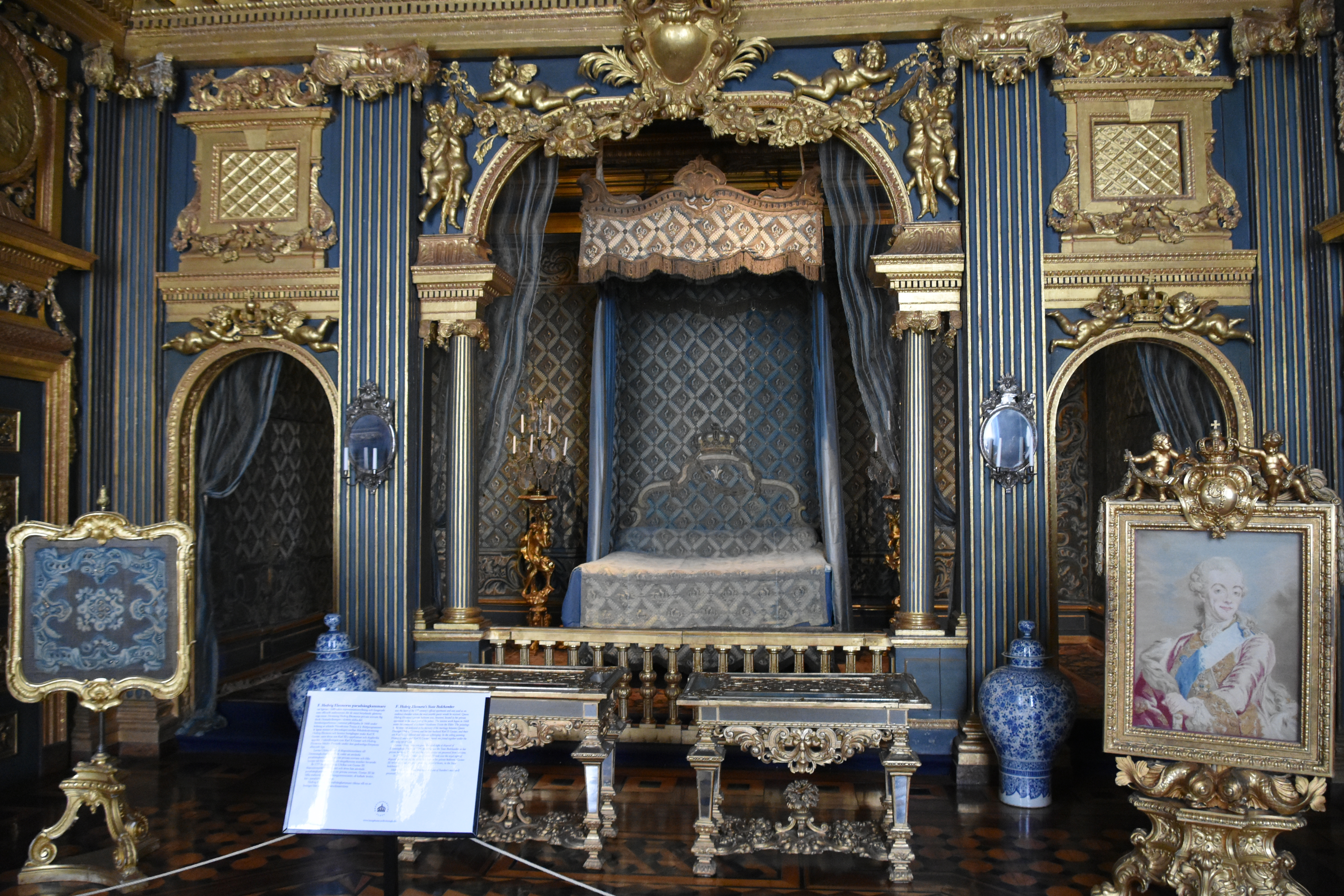
Hedwig Eleonora's State Bedchamber

The Queen Dowager Regent Hedwig Eleonora bought the castle throughout 1661, a year after her role as queen of Sweden ended, but it burnt to the ground on 30 December that same year. Hedwig Eleonora engaged the architect Nicodemus Tessin the Elder to design and rebuild the castle. In 1662, work began on the reconstruction of the building. With the castle almost complete, Tessin died in 1681. His son Nicodemus Tessin the Younger continued his work and completed the elaborate interior designs. The Flemish sculptor Nicolaes Millich made for the great staircase and hall sculptures of the nine muses in marble, along with a series of busts of Gothic kings. In addition, he also made bust portraits of King Charles X Gustav, his wife Hedwig Eleonor and both their sons, the young King Charles XI, probably also of Magnus Gabriel De la Gardie and his wife Maria Euphrosyne, a sister of King Charles X Gustav. Millich and his assistant Burchard Precht also made decorative wood carvings in the Queen Dowager's bed chamber.

During the period of the reconstruction, Hedwig Eleonora was head of the regency for the still-underage king, Charles XI of Sweden, from 1660 to 1672. Sweden had grown to be a powerful country after the Peace of Westphalia. The position of the Queen, essentially the ruler of Sweden, demanded an impressive residence located conveniently close to Stockholm.

During the reign of the kings Charles XI of Sweden and Charles XII of Sweden, the royal court was often present at the palace, which was used for hunting. Hedwig Eleonora used the palace as a summer residence until her death in 1715, also when she had become the undisputed host of the royal court during the absence of Charles XII in the Great Northern War (1700–1721).

=== 18th century ===
Drottningholm continued to serve regularly as a summer residence for the royal court during the entire 18th-century. After the death of Hedwig Eleonora in 1715, Queen Ulrika Eleonora of Sweden and King Frederick I of Sweden held court at the palace in the summer.

In 1744, the palace was given as a gift from King Frederick I to the then Crown Princess, later queen of Sweden, Louisa Ulrika of Prussia when she married Adolf Frederick of Sweden, who became king of Sweden in 1751. During Louisa Ulrika's ownership of Drottningholm the interior of the palace was transformed into a more sophisticated French rococo style. Louisa Ulrika was also responsible for having the Drottningholm Palace Theatre rebuilt in a grand style after the more modest original building burnt down in 1762. Louisa Ulrika and Adolf Fredrick continued to reside at the palace during their reign (1751–1771). In 1777, Louisa Ulrika sold Drottningholm to the Swedish state.

While it was owned by the Swedish state, the palace was used by King Gustav III of Sweden, son of Louisa Ulrika, as a summer residence, and a grand ceremonial court life was performed at the palace, which is considered to have been a great age for the palace, during which it was known for the elaborate masquerades and grand theatrical festivities and tournaments performed in the gardens. During the reign of Gustav IV Adolf of Sweden (reign 1792–1809) and Charles XIII of Sweden (reign 1809–1818) the palace was gradually used more sporadically. In 1797, it was the place of the great festivities when the King's bride, Frederica of Baden, was received there upon her arrival in Sweden, during which the last so called carousel, or tournament, was staged in the palace garden. After the Coup of 1809, the deposed Gustav IV Adolf was kept here under guard in the Chinese Drawing Room for eleven days.

=== 19th century ===
During the reign of Charles XIV John of Sweden (reign 1818–1844), the palace was abandoned. The King regarded it as a symbol of the old dynasty, and Drottningholm was left to decay. The buildings were damaged by the forces of nature, and their inventories were either taken away or auctioned off.

It was apparently opened to the public for the first time during this period: a tour was mentioned in 1819, and the public used the park for picnics. Occasionally, the grounds were used for public events: in 1823, the bride of the crown prince, Josephine of Leuchtenberg, was received upon her arrival to Sweden, and her name day continued to be celebrated here. Foreign guests such as Tsar Nicholas I of Russia were received in the palace gardens.

Oscar I of Sweden took an interest in the palace, and though he preferred Tullgarn Palace as summer residence, he took care to preserve the palace by doing the first repairs in 1846. He further more used it for public celebrations, such as a reception for Pan-Scandinavian students in 1856, and in 1858, the future Gustav V of Sweden was born in the palace. Charles XV of Sweden preferred Ulriksdal Palace as his summer residence and ignored Drottningholm, but Oscar II of Sweden continued the repairs.

Both Oscar I and Oscar II were criticized for modernizing the palace and adjusting it to contemporary fashion rather than restoring it to its original state, and it was not until the reign of Gustav V that the palace and surroundings were reconstructed to their 18th-century appearance. In 1907, a major four-year restoration of the palace was begun to restore it to its former state, after which the royal court began to use it regularly again.

=== Royal residence ===
Since 1981 King Carl XVI Gustaf and Queen Silvia of Sweden have resided in the southern wing of the palace. The other parts of the palace are open to the public. Also during this time there has been, just like at Stockholm Palace, a unit of royal guards stationed at the palace. During the COVID-19 pandemic the King and Queen carried out some of their work from their home in the palace. Otherwise their official workplace has remained at Stockholm Palace.

For the Queens 50th Birthday in 1993 she was gifted a swimming pavilion worth 9 million SEK by the Wallenberg family that was attached to the south wings courtyard. To get permission to construct the pavilion it was constructed in a way that would allow its demolition without harming the original palace. In 2018 the pavilion was renovated for a cost of 744 000 SEK, taken from taxpayer money since it is now counted as a part of a state owned building and as such it is the job of the state to maintain it.

== The palace ==
The palace and its grounds have seen many renovations, changes and additions over the past 400 years. The largest renovation, in which electricity, heating, sewage, water lines were either installed or updated and the castle roof replaced, took place between 1907 and 1913. During a 20-year-period beginning around 1977, several major areas of the palace were restored and rebuilt. The library and national hall received much of the attention and fire protection was installed throughout the palace. In 1997, work began to clean and rebuild the exterior walls. This was completed in 2002.

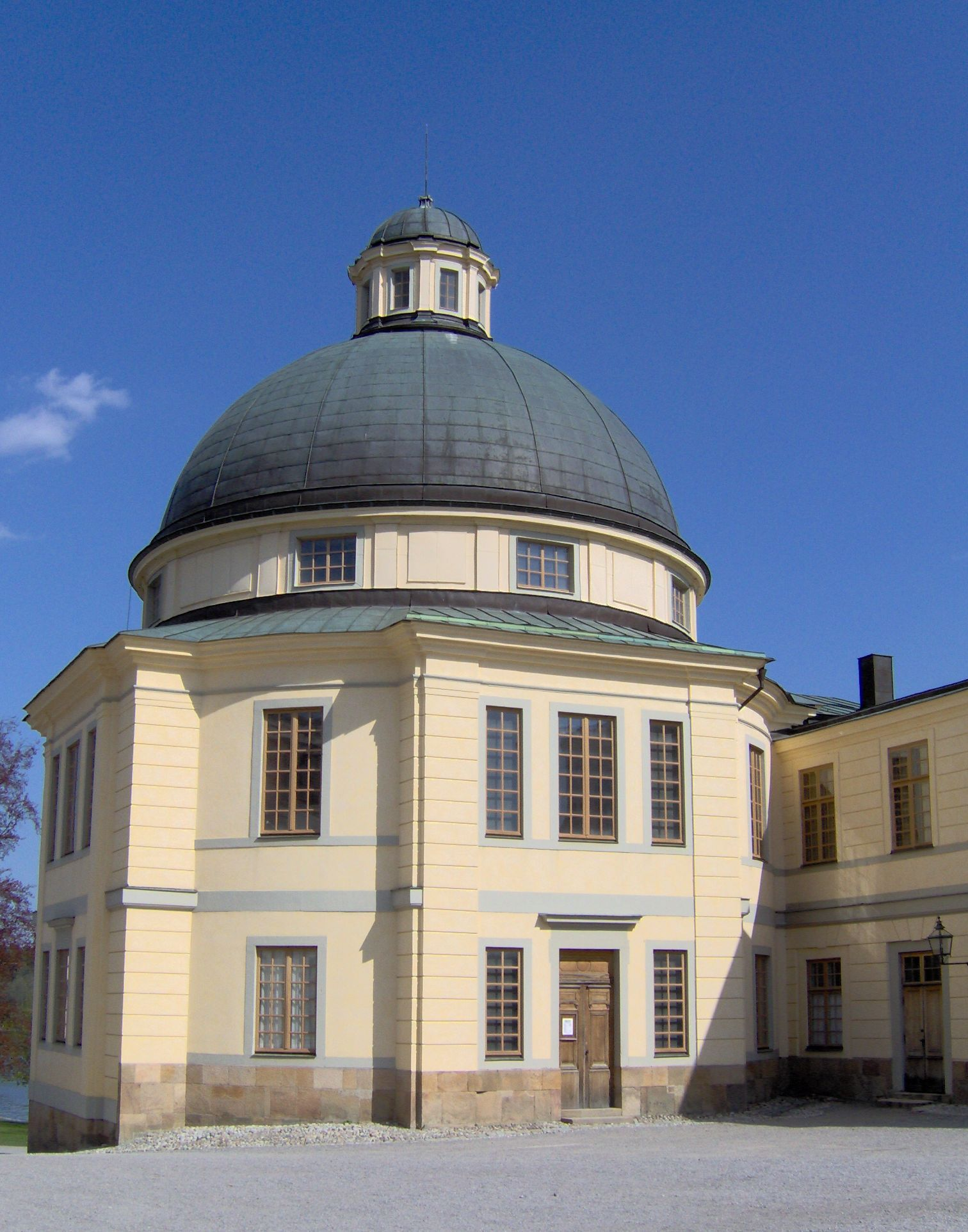
Drottningholm Palace Chapel

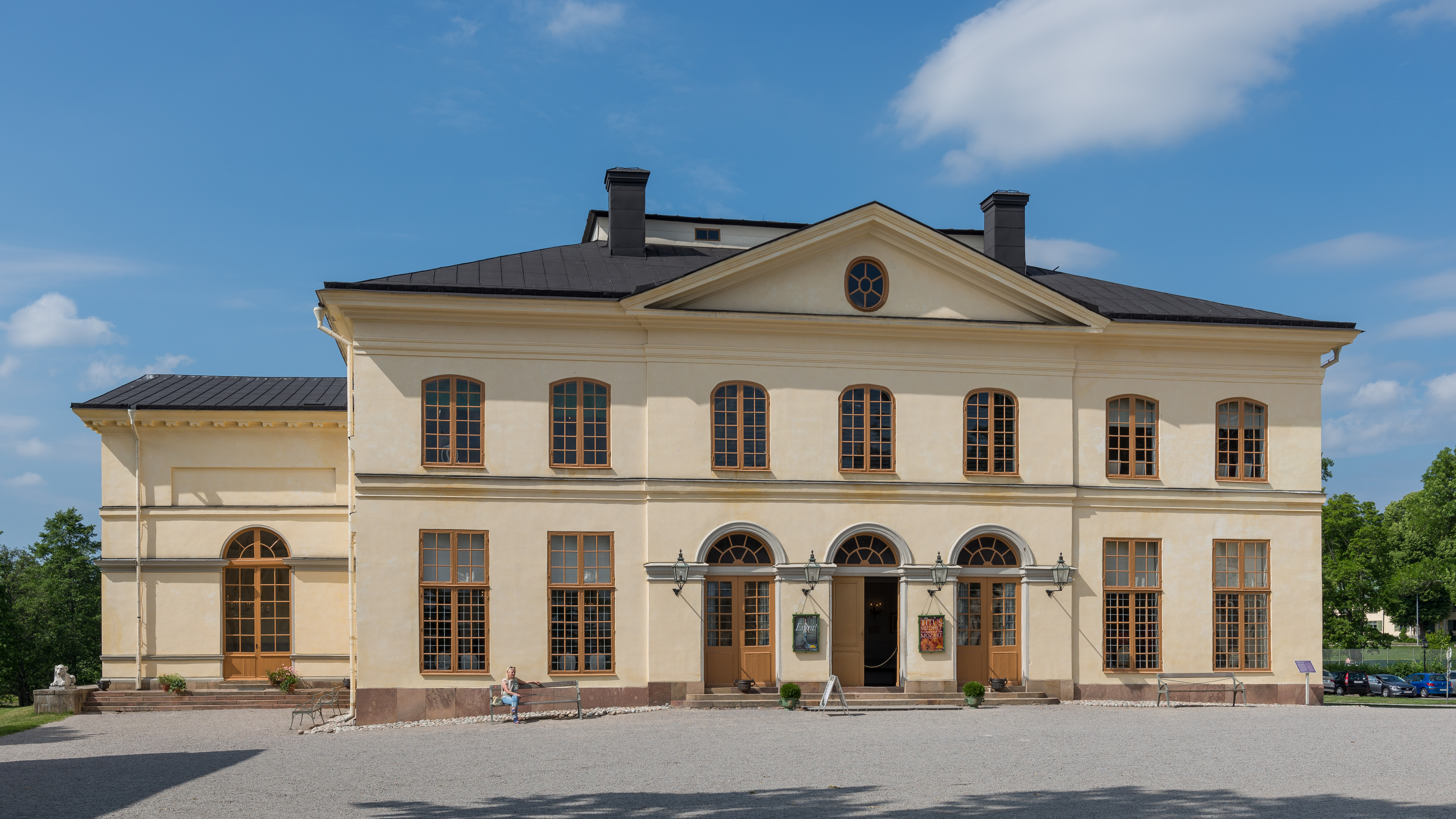
Drottningholm Palace Theatre

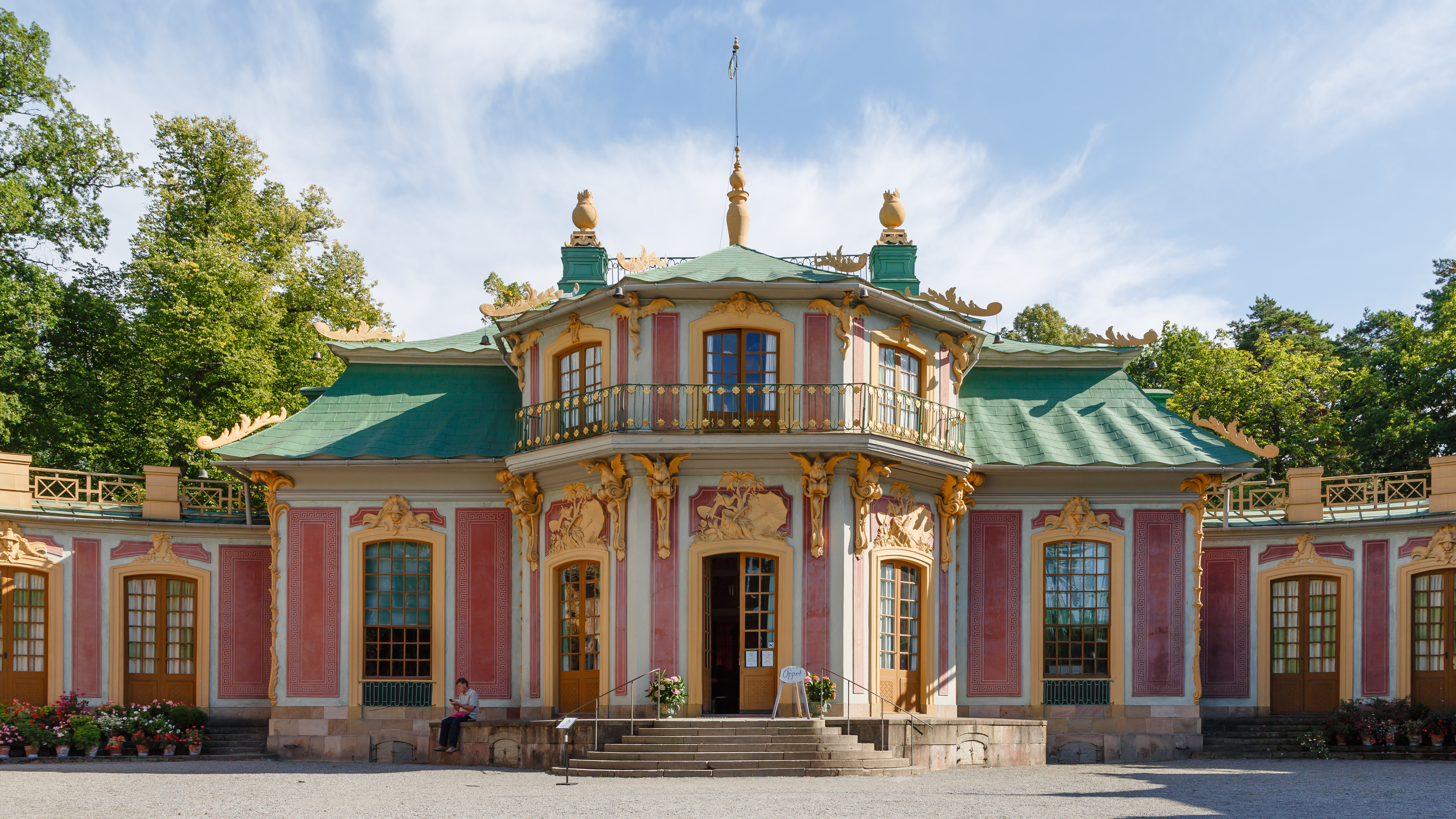
Chinese Pavilion

=== The palace church ===
The church was designed and erected by Nicodemus Tessin the Elder. It was completed by his son in May, 1746.

It is still used by the people of Lovön parish, who worship in the church on the last Sunday of every month. Inside the castle church a Cahman organ from 1730 is still in use. Another noteworthy item is the traditional church tapestry which was made by Gustav V of Sweden.

=== The palace theatre ===
The Drottningholm Palace Theatre is the opera house located at the palace. It is still in use, and its summer opera festivals are quite popular. At times the Royal Swedish Opera company guest performs.

=== The Chinese Pavilion ===
The Chinese Pavilion (Kina Slott), located on the grounds of the Drottningholm Palace park, is a Chinese-inspired royal pavilion built in 1763–1770.

== The gardens ==
The gardens and park areas surrounding the castle and its buildings are one of the main attractions for the tourists that visit the palace each year. The gardens have been established in stages since the castle was built, resulting in different styles of parks and gardens.

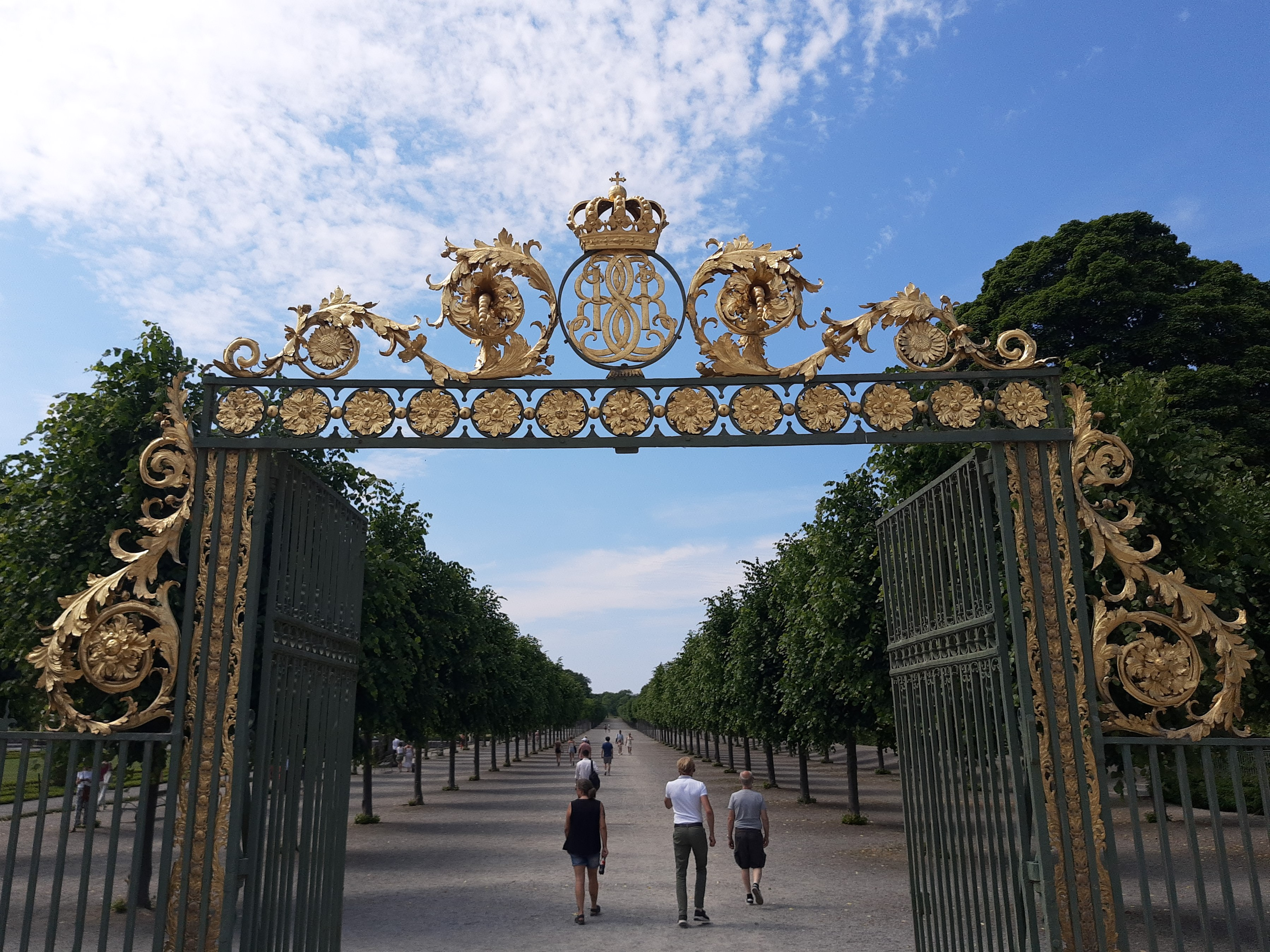
Gate to the palace park

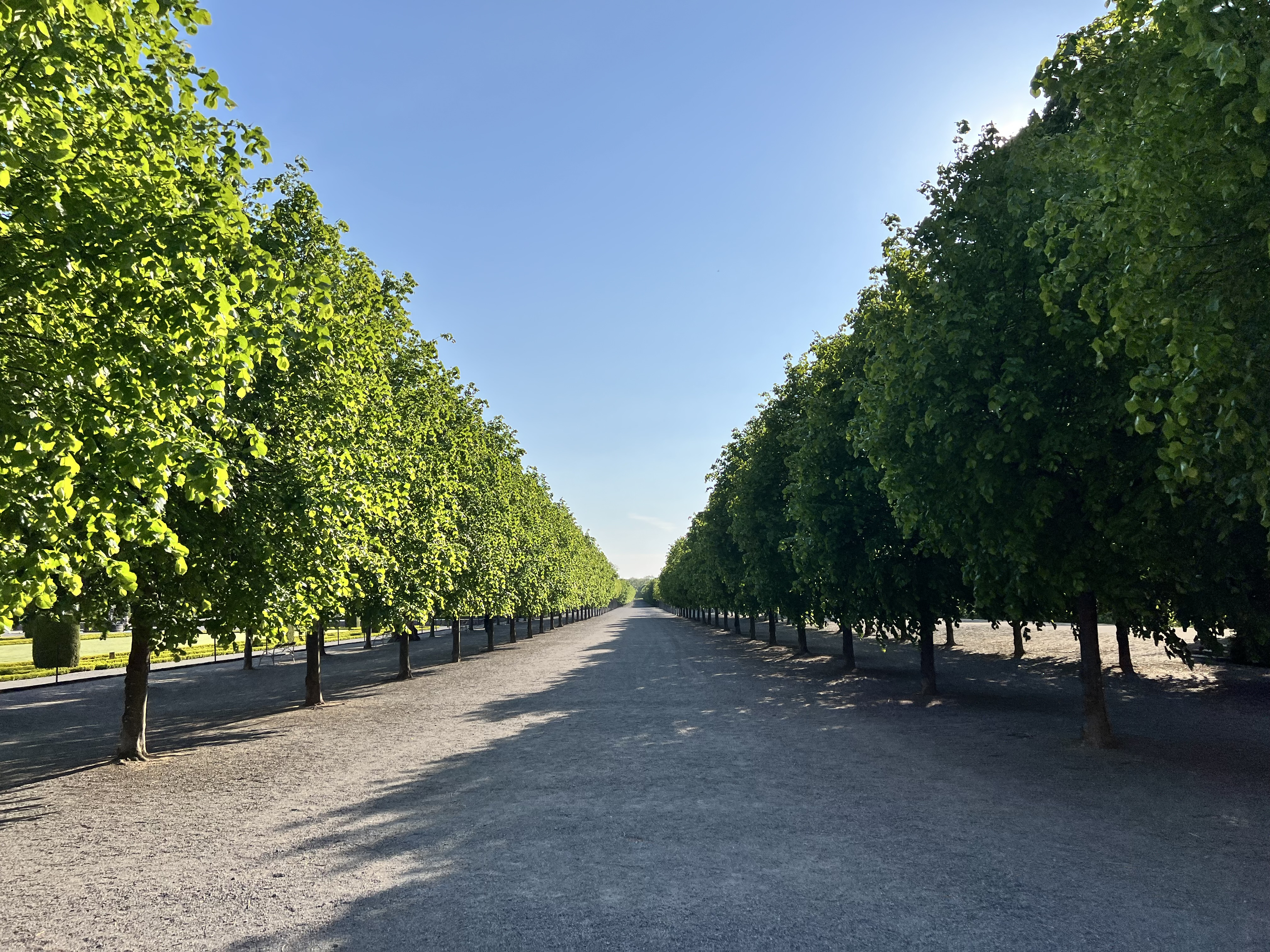
An allée in the palace park

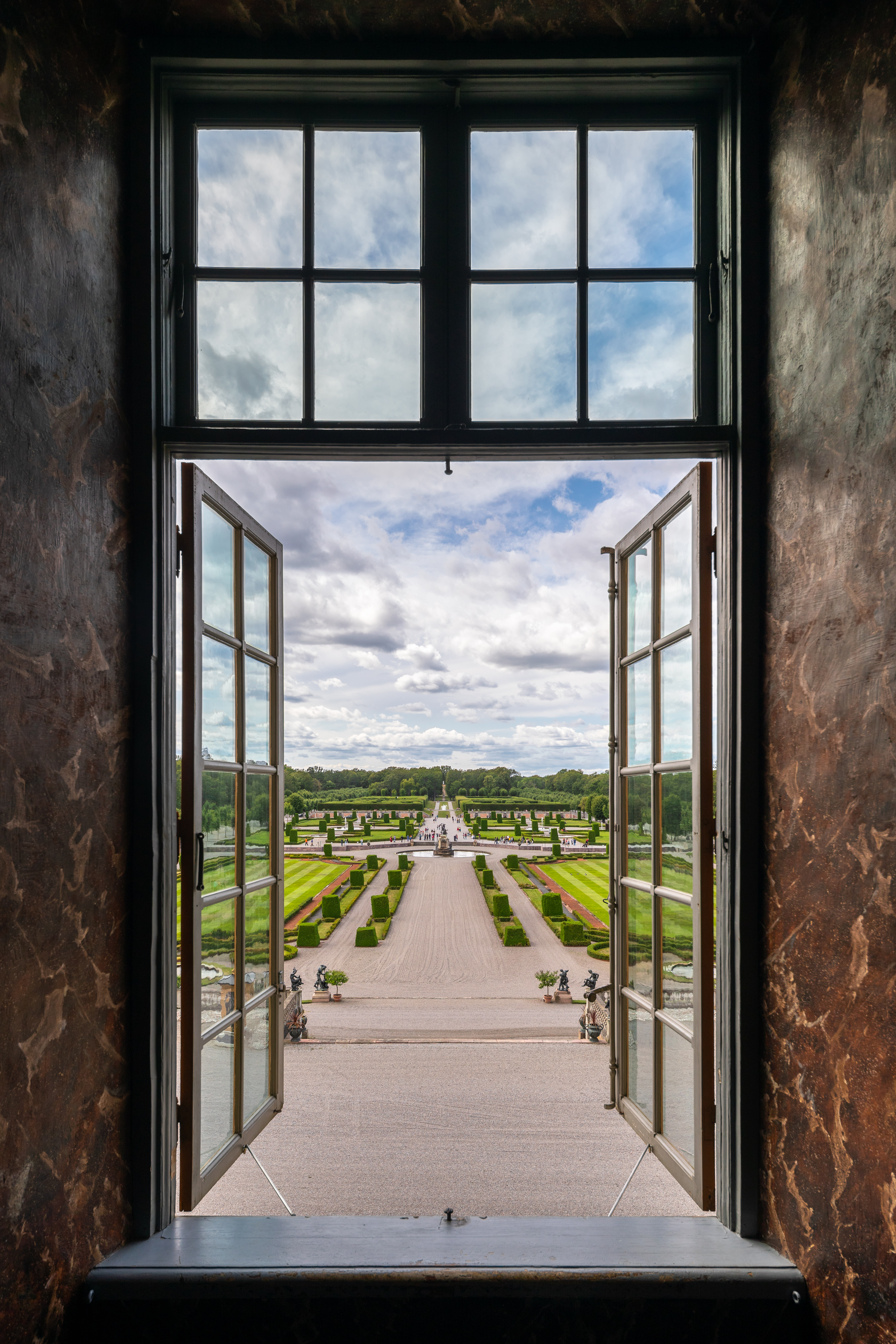
View of the Baroque garden, seen from the palace

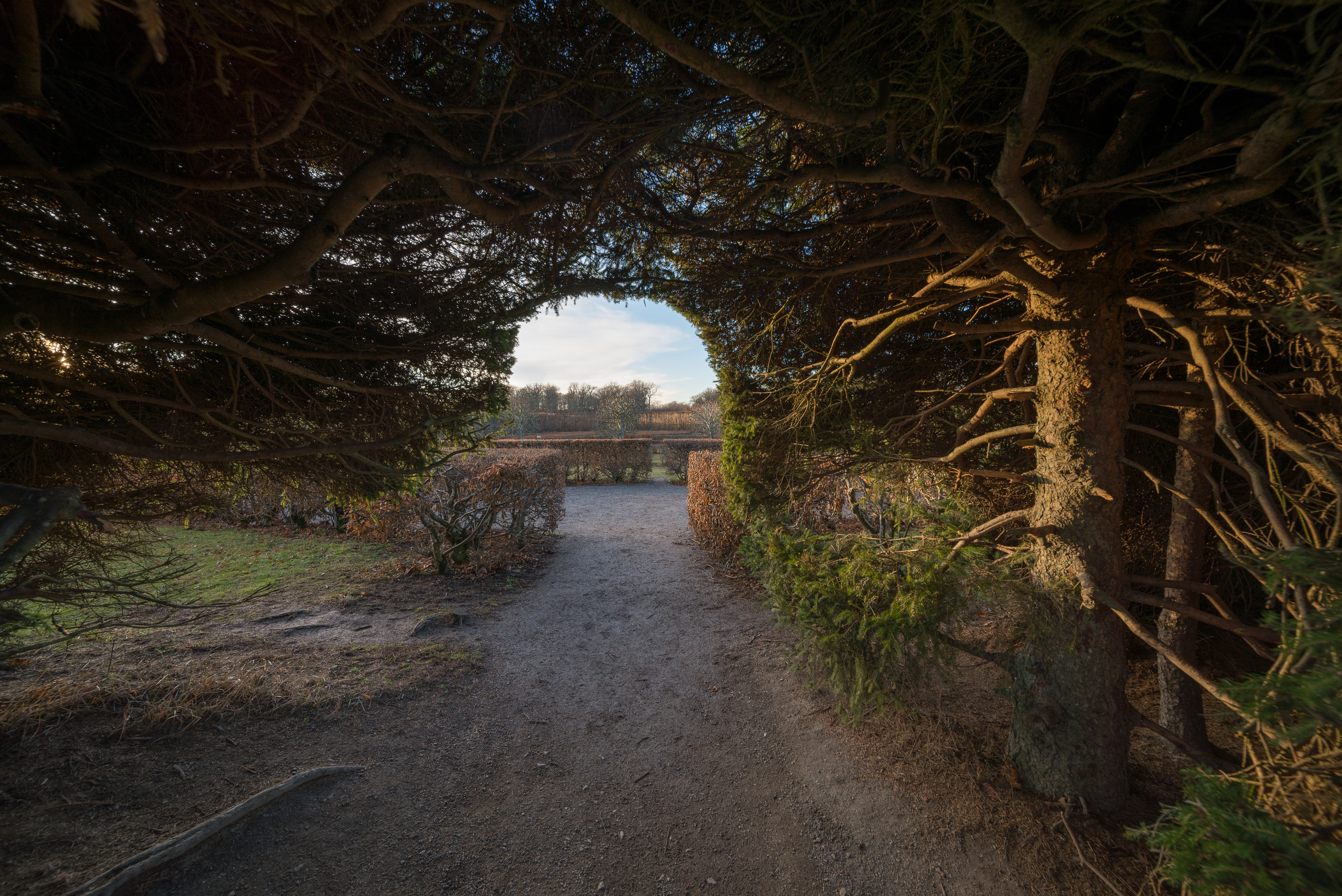
Bosquet in the palace gardens

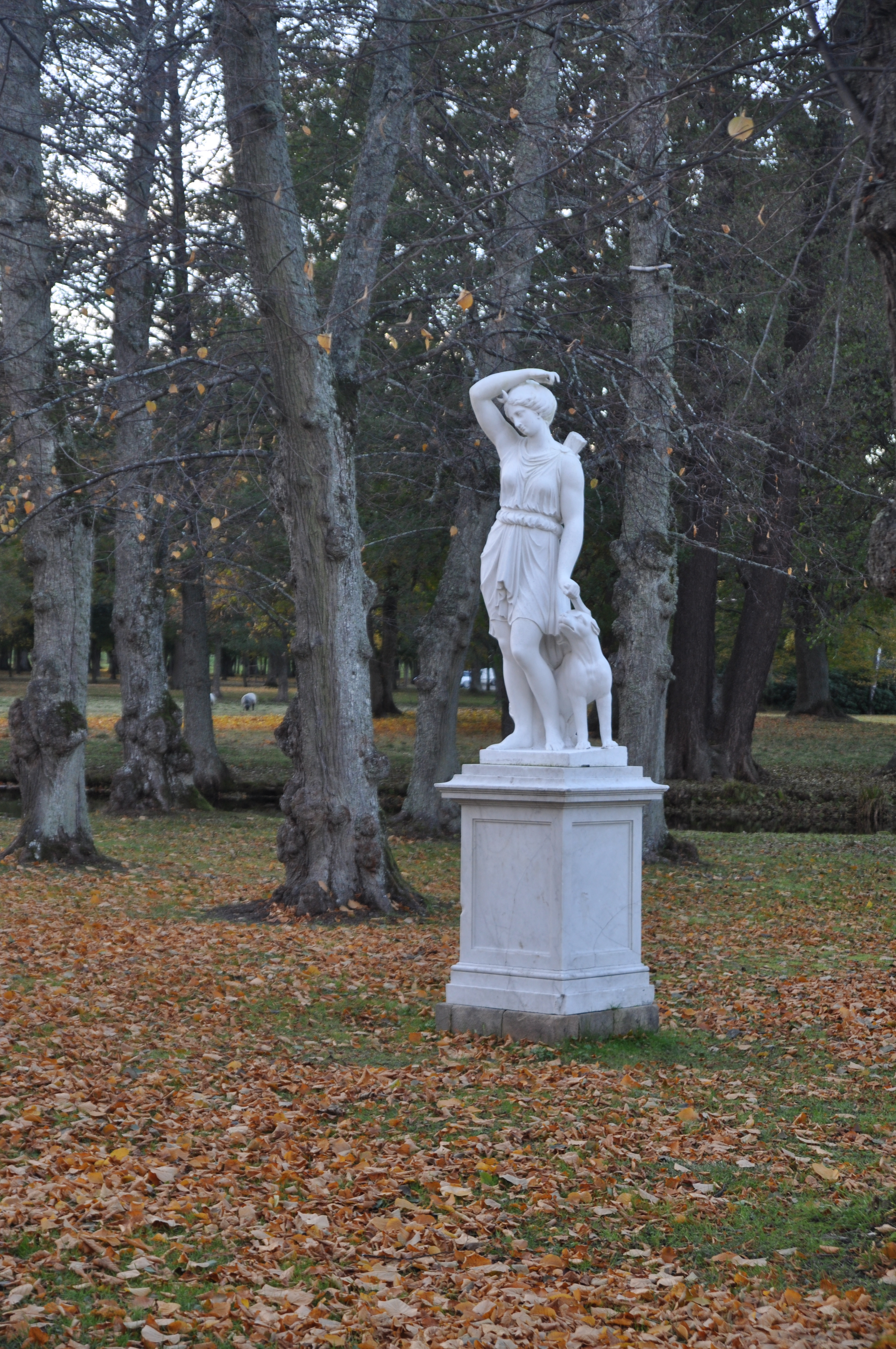
Statue of Diana

=== The Baroque garden ===
The oldest part of the gardens was created at the end of the 17th century under the direction of Hedwig Eleonora. The father and son Tessin led the project that created a Baroque garden right outside the main palace, flanked by thick tree avenues. The many statues scattered throughout this area were created by the artist Adrian de Vries; the Swedish army took them as spoils of war from the Wallenstein Palace in Prague, while the two marble lions at the main gate of the palace were transported from the Ujazdów Castle in Warsaw. The Baroque garden was neglected along with the rest of the grounds during the 19th century, but was restored in the 1950s and 1960s on the initiative of Gustaf VI Adolf of Sweden.

=== The English garden ===
Gustav III of Sweden took the initiative for the English landscape garden of Drottningholm. This lies north of the Baroque garden and consists of two ponds with canals, bridges, large open lawns, and trees in groups or avenues. Walkways are laid out throughout this large part of the park.

Throughout this area "vistas" can be seen, cleared lines of sight that are intentionally constructed to draw the eye to a particular view. Most of the antique marble statues throughout the gardens were purchased by Gustav III from Italy. The purpose of the statues is to surprise a visitor by their unexpected appearance in a green area, or as a focal point for a vista.

== UNESCO World Heritage Site ==
The palace is a UNESCO World Heritage Site, mainly because of the Drottningholm Palace Theatre and the Chinese Pavilion. It was added to the list in 1991. The UNESCO comments were:

The Royal Domain of Drottningholm stands on an island in Lake Mälar in a suburb of Stockholm. With its palace, perfectly preserved theatre (built in 1766), Chinese pavilion and gardens, it is the finest example of an 18th-century northern European royal residence inspired by the Palace of Versailles.

== Gallery ==
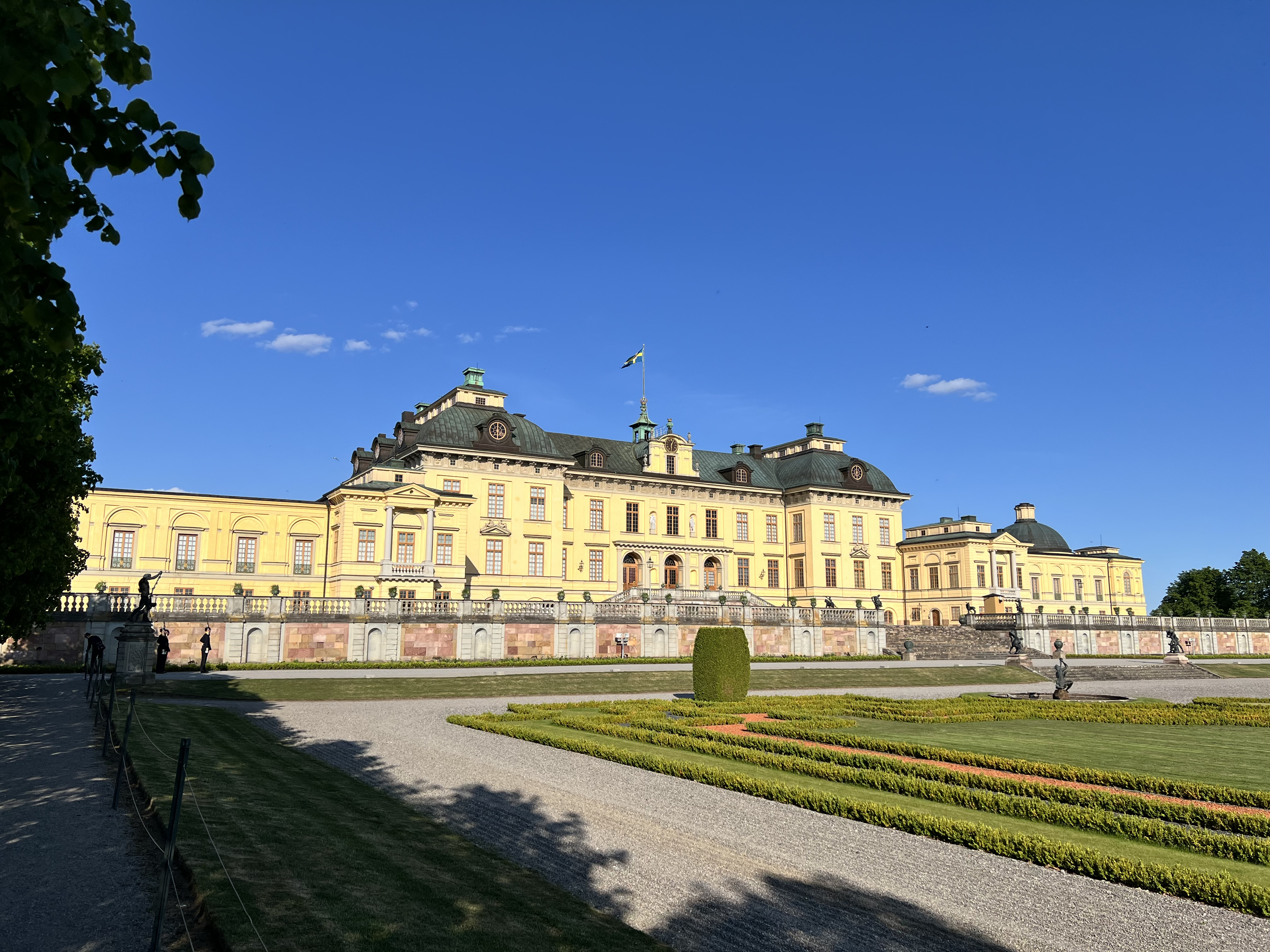
Drottningholm Palace, rear

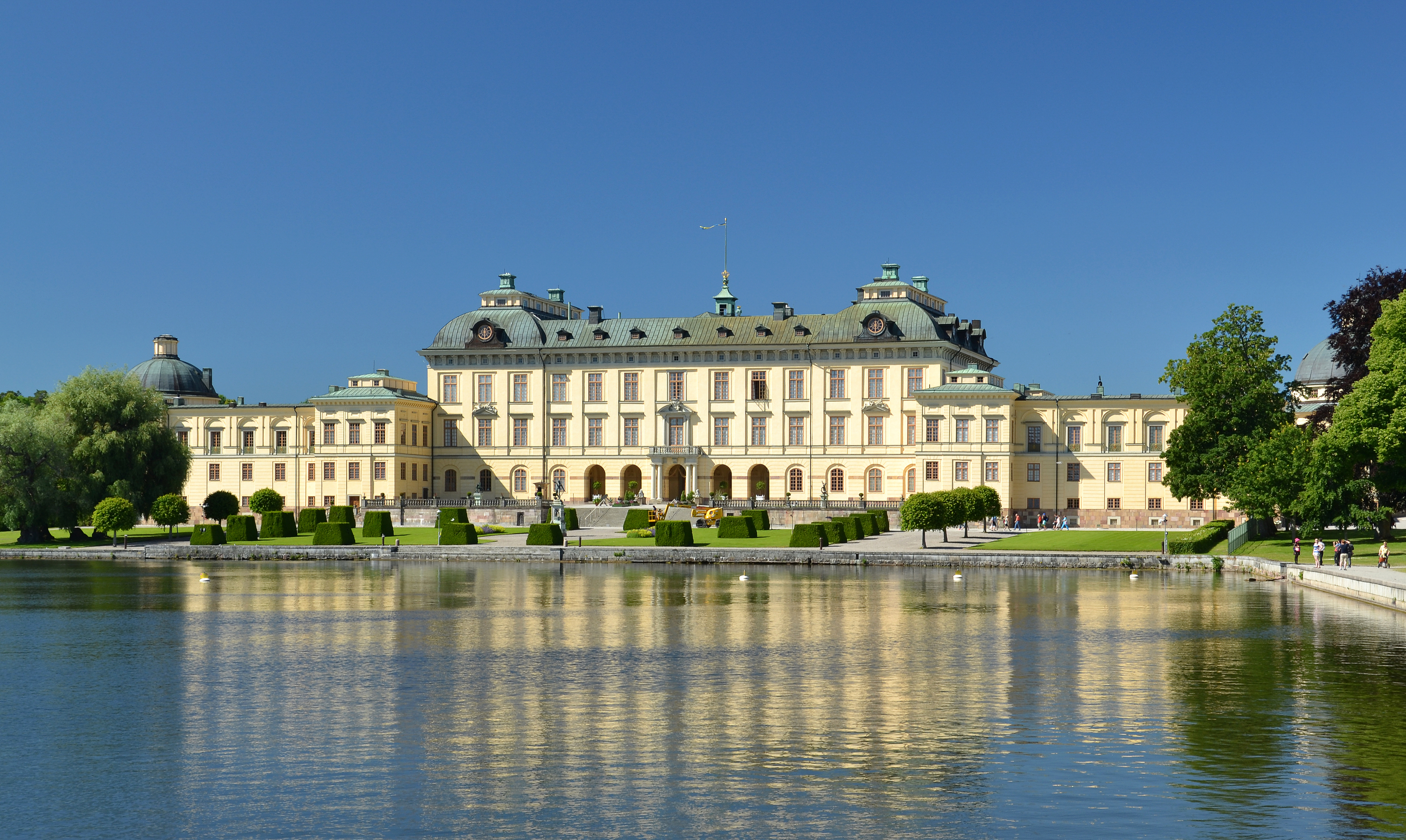
East façade

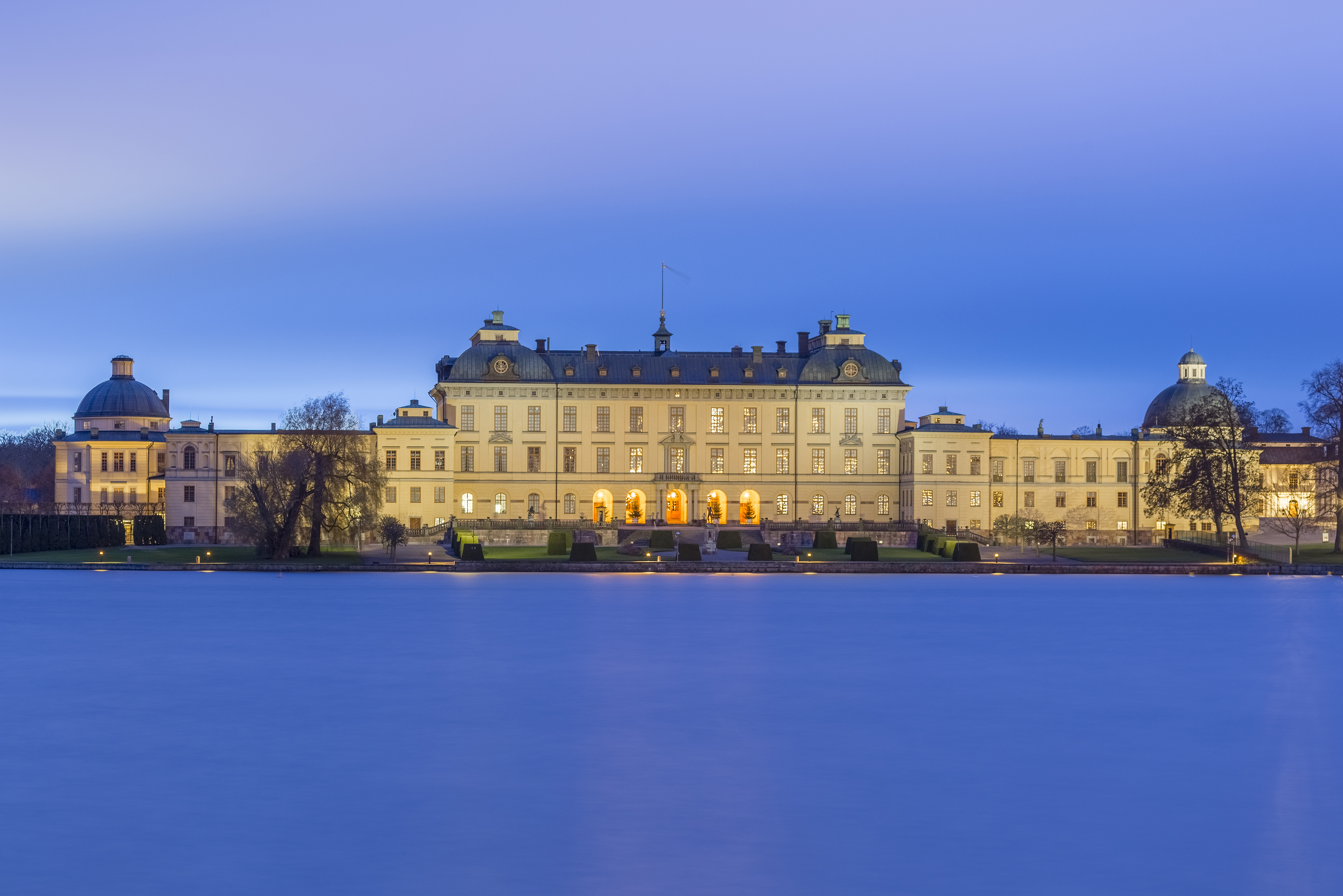
The palace seen from Kärsön in evening

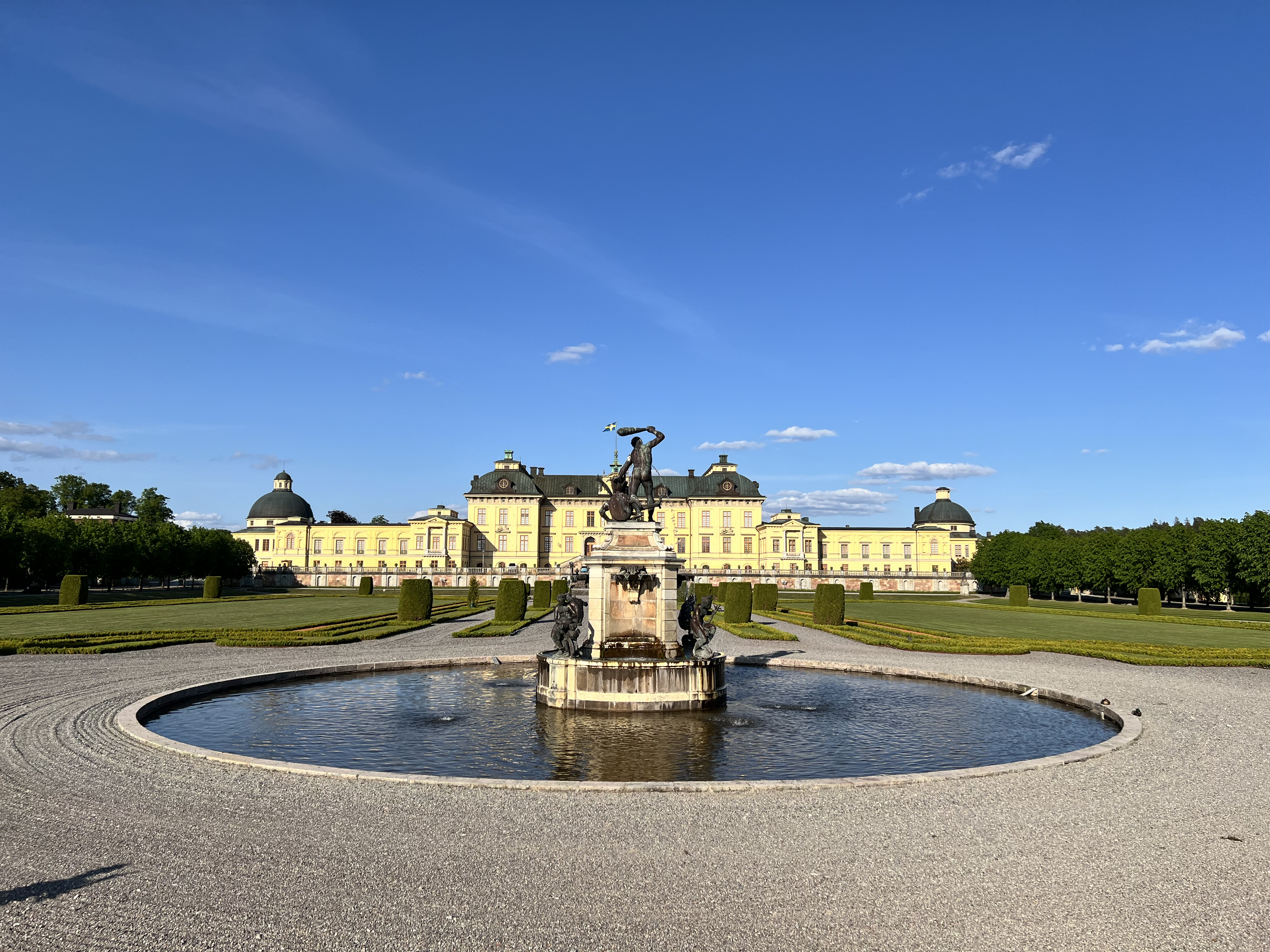
View of the palace with the Hercules fountain in front

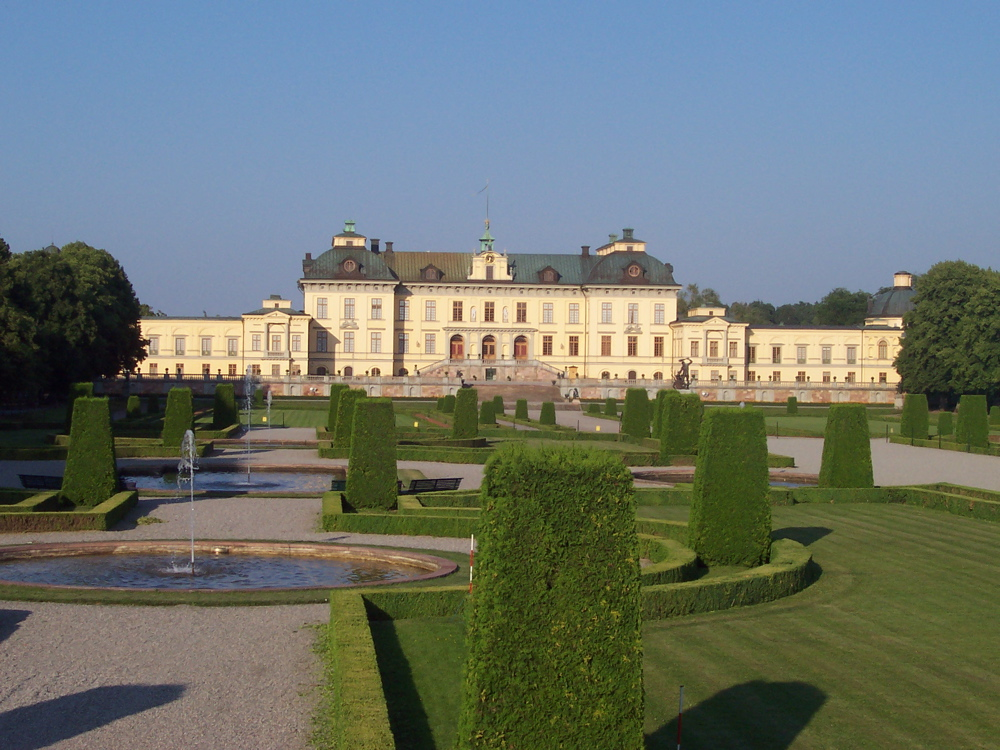
The strict lines of a Baroque garden

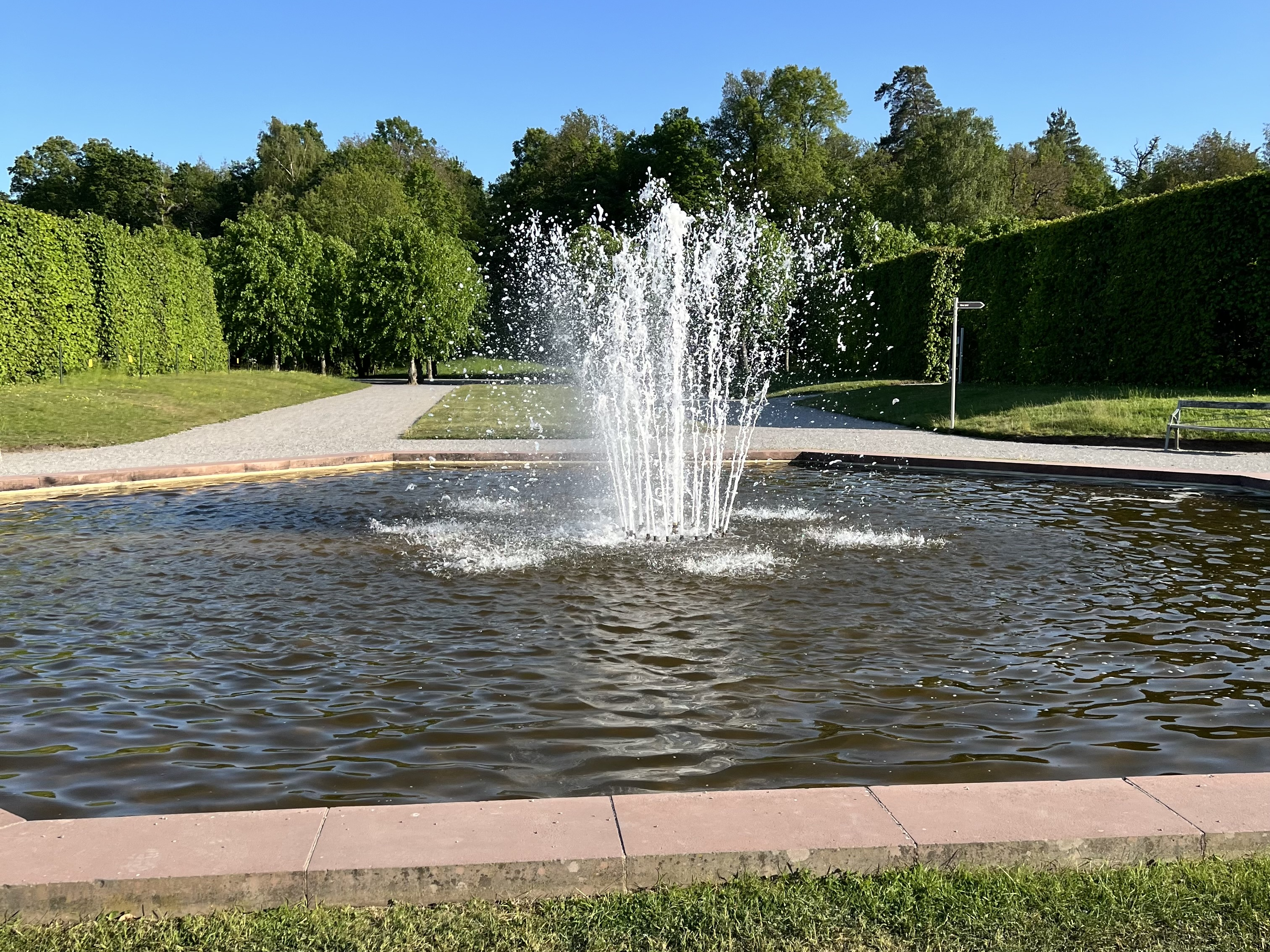
Fountain

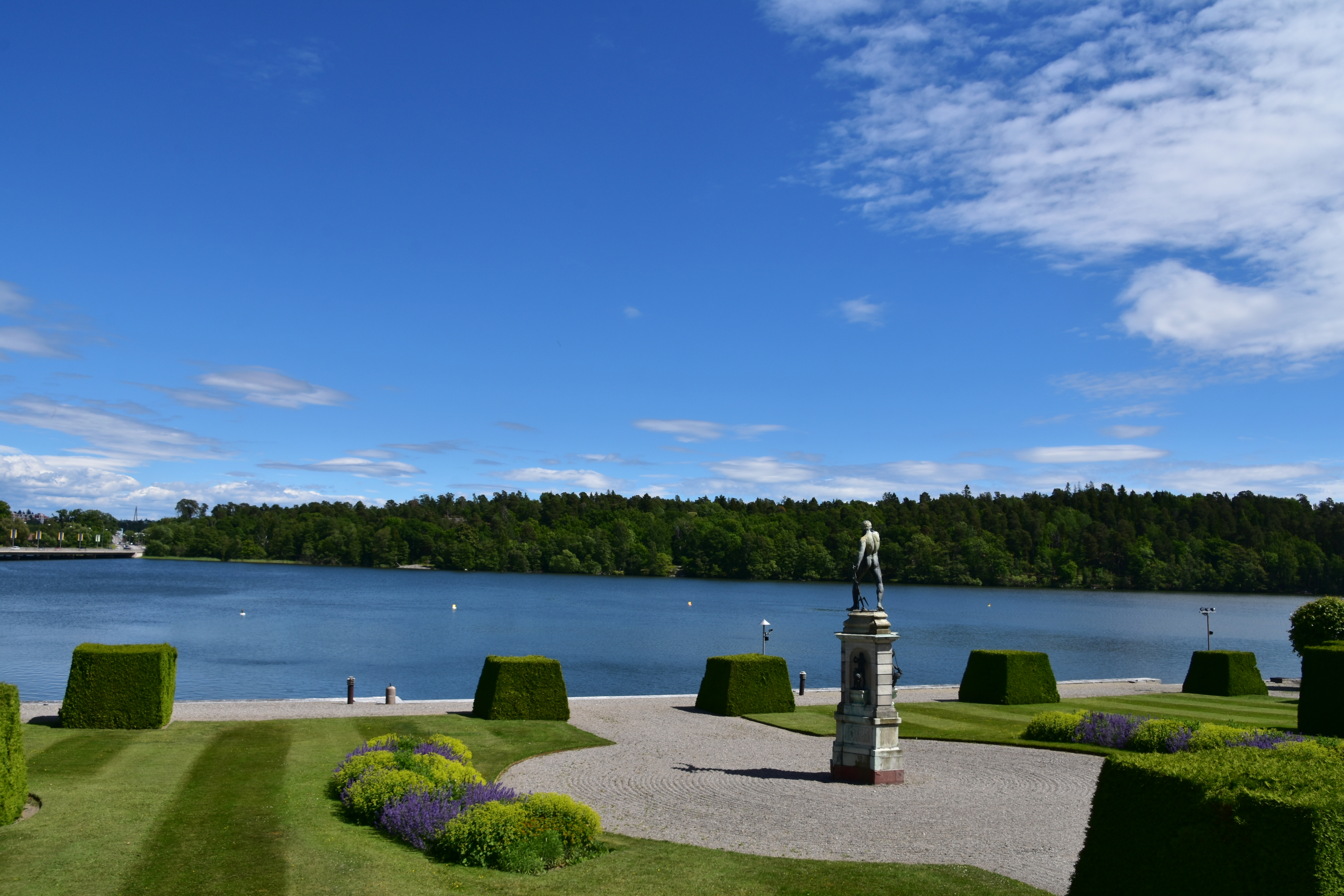
Neptune by Adriaen de Vries in the Sjöparterren

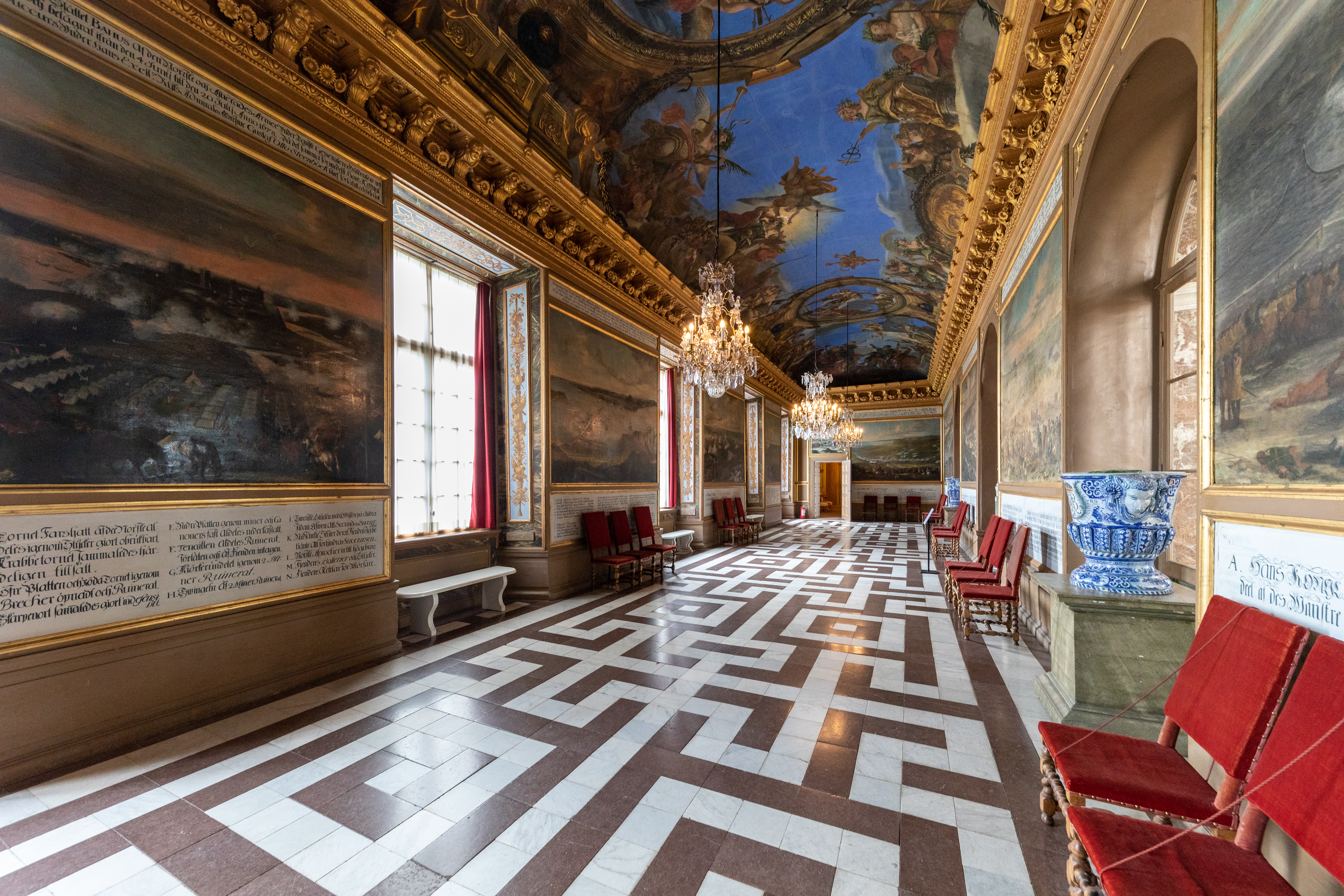
Karl XI's Gallery

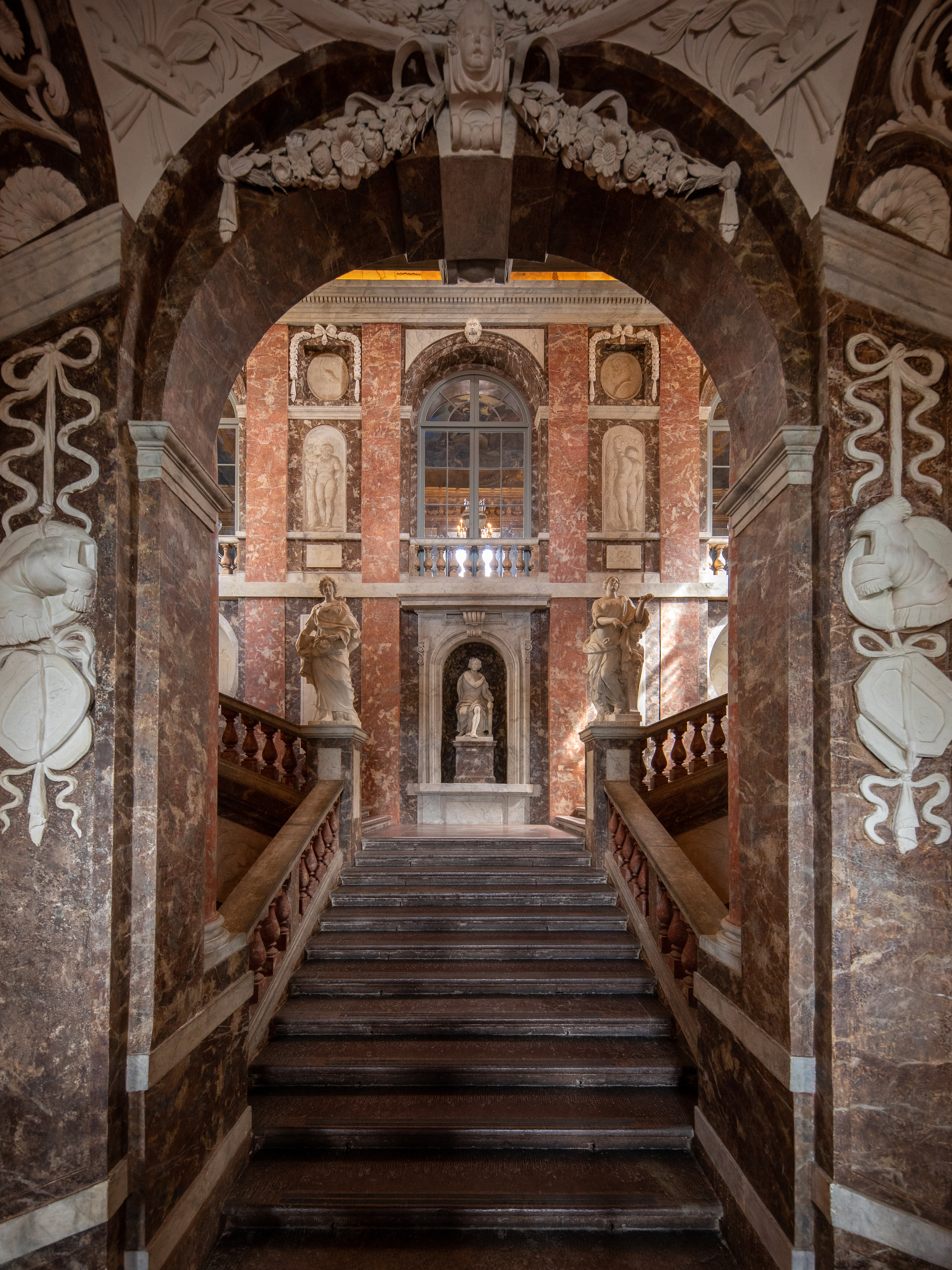
The palace's grand staircase

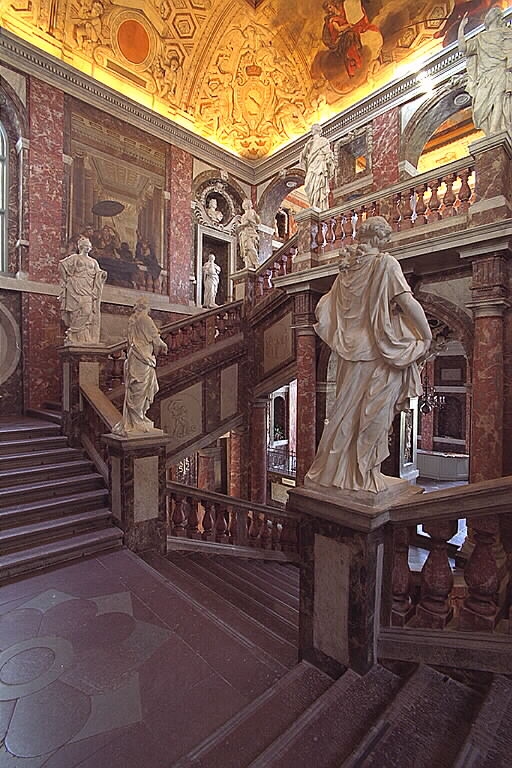
The great staircase with sculptures by Nicolaes Millich

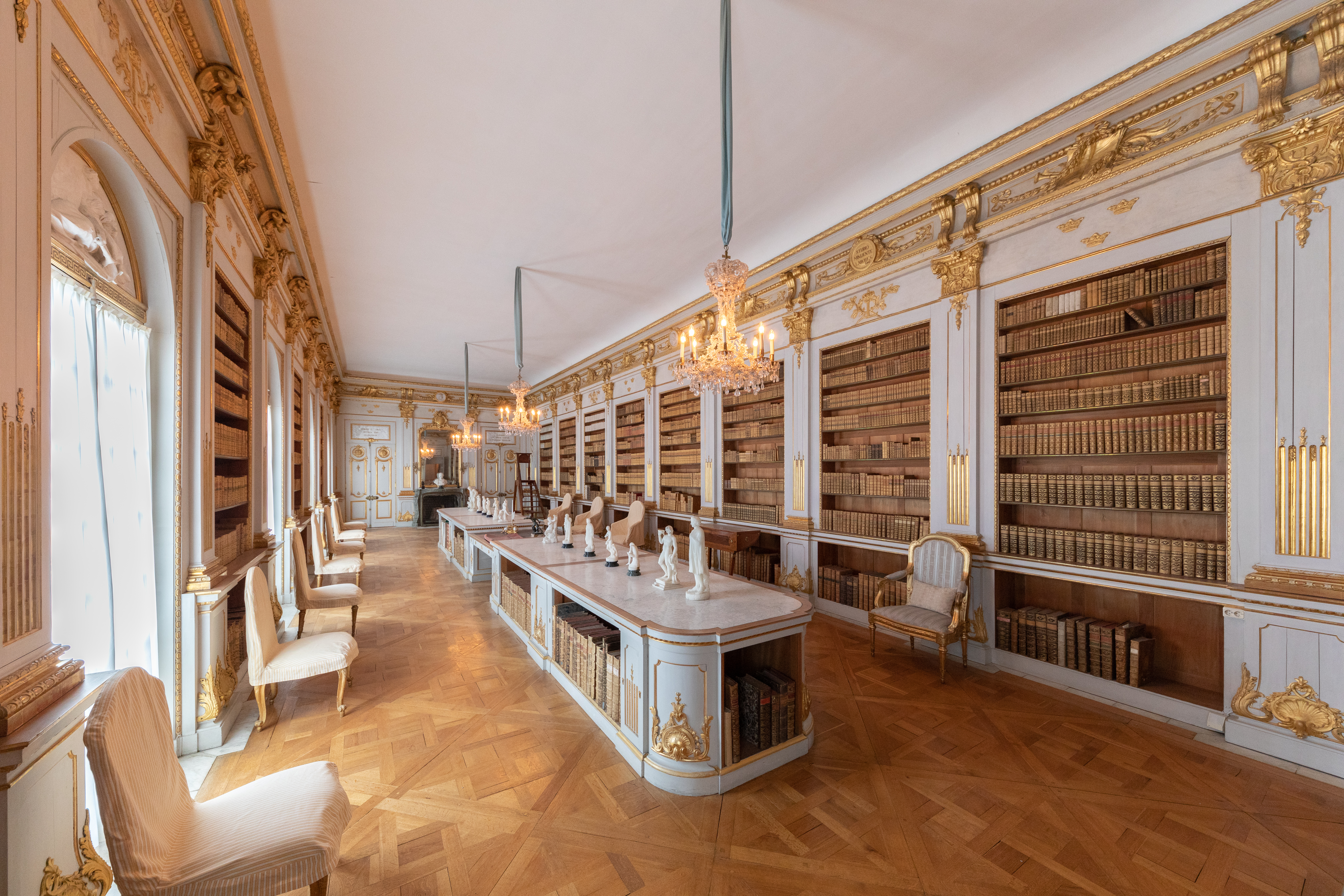
The palace library

== See also ==
- List of Baroque residences
