= Van Wijngaarden =

Van Wijngaarden is a Dutch toponymic surname meaning "from Wijngaarden", a town in South Holland. Alternatively, it can refer to an origin in Sint Jacobiparochie in Friesland, which originally also was called "Wijngaarden". People with this name include:

- Adriaan van Wijngaarden (1916–1987), Dutch mathematician and computer scientist
  - He devised a.o. the Van Wijngaarden grammar and the Van Wijngaarden transformation
- Gert Jan van Wijngaarden (born 1964), Dutch archeologist
- Jeroen van Wijngaarden (born 1978), Dutch VVD politician
- Piet van Wijngaarden (1898–1950), Dutch motorcycle racer
- Theo van Wijngaarden (1874–1952), Dutch art forger
