= Frederik H. Kreuger =

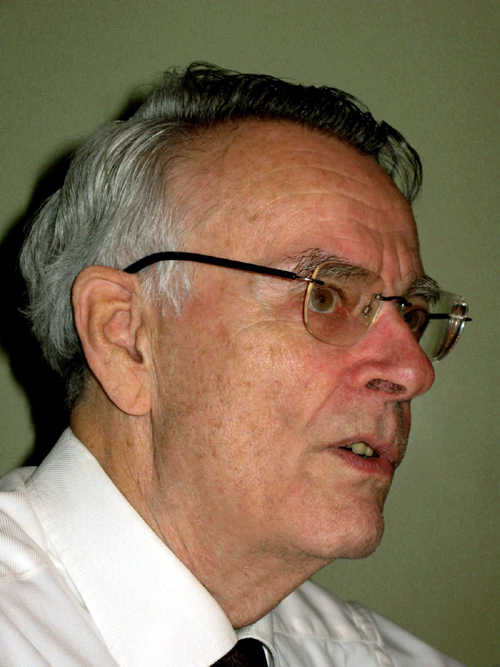
- Frederik H. Kreuger
- Born: 14 May 1928; Amsterdam, Netherlands
- Died: 10 January 2015 (aged 86); Delft, Netherlands

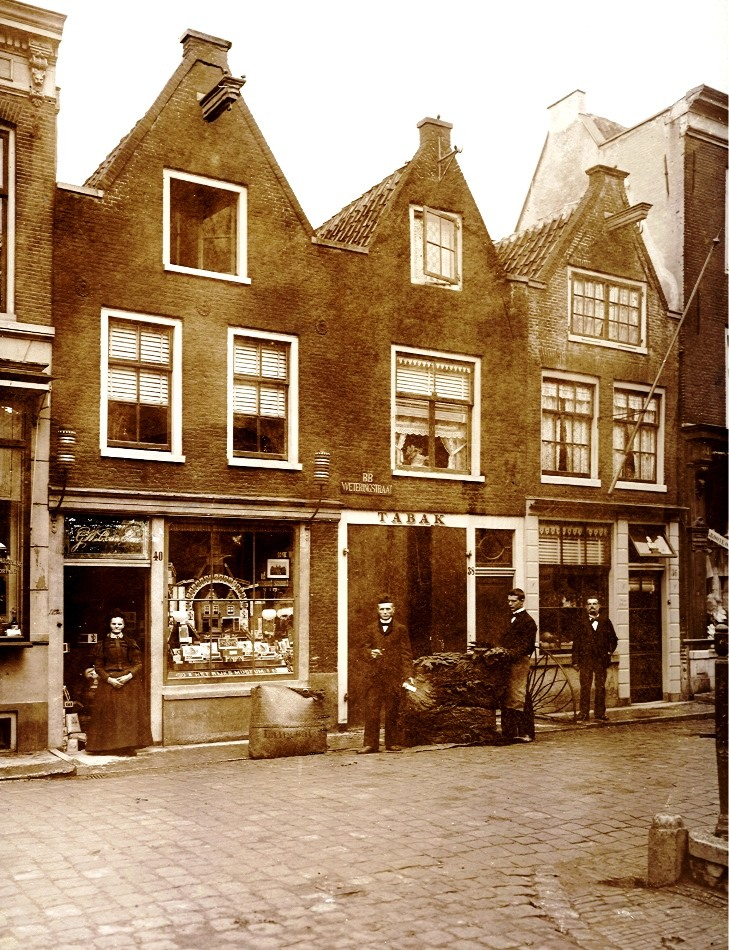
The tobacco factory "Het Wapen van Spanje" anno 1893 in Weteringstraat 40, Amsterdam.

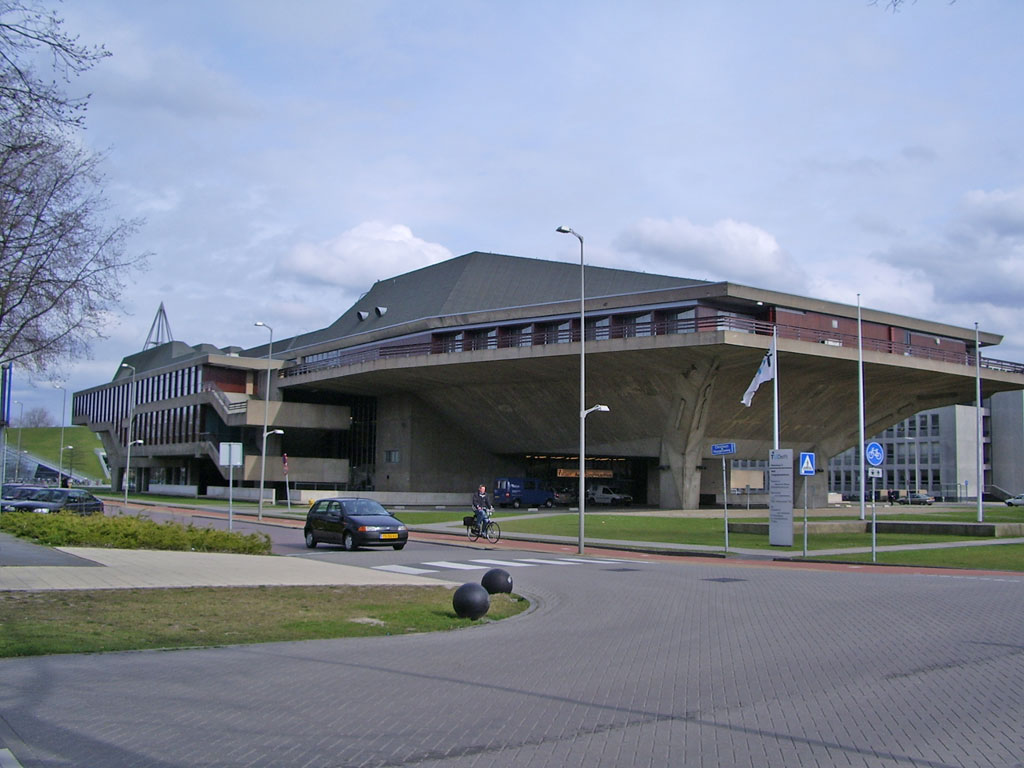
The Delft University of Technology.

Frederik Hendrik Kreuger (14 May 1928 – 10 January 2015), was a Dutch high voltage scientist and inventor, lived in Delft, the Netherlands, and was professor emeritus of the Delft University of Technology. He was also a professional author of technical literature, nonfiction books, thrillers and a decisive biography of the master forger Han van Meegeren.

== Biography ==
Frederik H. Kreuger stems from an old Amsterdam family where his maternal grandfather ran a small tobacco factory "Het Wapen van Spanje" in the Weteringstraat, in the old town near the Rijksmuseum. He published a Book about his grandfather, this tobacco factory and the explosive development of science and technique in the Belle Époque, the period his grandfather lived.

He was educated in Haarlem HBS B (a bèta-oriented secondary school), took his Engineer's degree at the Delft University of Technology in the Netherlands and received there his Ph.D. degree in 1961. He worked as a high voltage scientist in Sweden, England and the Netherlands. In the Netherlands he was employed by the electrical industry and became later managing director of the Nederlandse Kabelfabriek in Delft. In 1986 he became a high voltage professor of his Alma mater in Delft and worked there until 1995.

He was the inventor of several constructions for high voltage cable systems and of equipment for the detection of partial discharges. Some examples are:

- balanced detection of partial discharges (P.D.s) (also called Kreuger bridge)
- discharge standard for partial discharge (P.D.) measurements.
- the (now usual) elastomeric joints in solid H.V. cables (also called bi-manchet)
- the (now usual) elastomeric terminals for solid H.V. cables

His book Partial Discharge Detection was for twenty-five years the leading text book in this field. He has also published books about Management and Mismanagement in Research and Disadvantages of Wind Energy. His high voltage laboratory in Delft became a centre of knowledge for partial discharge detection and for the study of Direct current high voltage.

Kreuger was also the inventor of a system for gaining solar power from sea by large floating algea fields producing biofuel (European Patent EP07110895 – 22 June 2007). This project is managed by the Botanical Garden of the Department Biotechnology of the Delft University of Technology; several departments of the University are cooperating herein.

Kreuger made a study of his fellow-townsman Johannes Vermeer and Vermeer's use of the Camera Obscura. He also published a study about the location where Vermeer might have painted his Little Street (Vermeer). An English translation of this study is present in the Municipal archives of Delft.

Kreuger started in 2001 to study the life of the famous Dutch forger Han van Meegeren. His first book on Van Meegeren was a Dutch novel.

It was translated later on in English as "The Deception", also featuring some sketches about the life of Johannes Vermeer. A short biography "Real life of Van Meegeren" is found at the end of this novel.

Kreuger was in an opportune position to write his biography about Van Meegeren because his native language is Dutch and also because he lived in the Netherlands at the time when Van Meegeren was active. He searched for primary sources – especially in the Netherlands – and added in this way to the knowledge gained by John Godley, 3rd Baron Kilbracken, who was a pioneer in this field, and to that of Marie Louise Doudart de la Grée, who interviewed Van Meegeren in 1946 and wrote a Dutch biography in 1966.

Kreuger was fortunate to meet the last living relatives of Han van Meegeren and also the last surviving witness of his arrest, and he discovered an unpublished biography of Van Meegeren's son Jacques, containing new information on the artist's life. Besides he found unknown photographs related to Van Meegeren.

In addition, he revealed paintings under the artist's own name and he also identified some more fake Old Masters made by Van Meegeren.

In 2004, he published his findings in Dutch in Han van Meegeren, Meestervervalser, where new facts and newly found works of Van Meegeren were collected.

In 2006 followed De Arrestatie van een Meestervervalser, again in Dutch, in which the many reactions on his first biography were incorporated.

The resulting English biography A New Vermeer. Life and Work of Han van Meegeren 2007 was named after a notorious article A New Vermeer, where the great art-expert Dr. Abraham Bredius praised the Van Meegeren fake Emmaus as the finest Vermeer painting ever seen.
In this book he also describes the life of Van Meegeren's son Jacques van Meegeren; he discovered that Jacques in his turn had forged the work of his father.

Kreuger played the leading violin in the amateur gipsy orchestra Siperkov Ensemble. He made a study of Gipsy or Romani music and published a book in Dutch about the history and perception of Gipsy music. An excerpt of this book appeared as the article "Zigeunermuziek" in the Dutch version of Wikipedia.

The scientific career of Frederik Hendrik Kreuger by Morshuis, P.H.F. reviews the career of Frederik Hendrik Kreuger and his work in the field of high voltage research:

On 10 January 2015, NRC Handelsblad announced Kreuger died in Delft, aged 86.

== Bibliography (English titles only) ==
- Frederik H. Kreuger: Detection and location of discharges: in particular in plastic-insulated high-voltage cables. Doctoral thesis, Delft 1961.
- Frederik H. Kreuger: Discharge Detection in High Voltage Equipment. Temple Press, London 1964; Japanese translation through Charles Tuttle Co, Tokyo 1968 and illegal translations in Russian and Chinese after 1968.
- Frederik H. Kreuger: Management and Mismanagement in Research. Alphen aan de Rijn 1972
- Frederik H. Kreuger: Partial Discharge Detection. Butterworth, London 1989
- Frederik H. Kreuger: Industrial High Voltage in three volumes, University Press, Delft 1991, 1992, 1993. AC High Voltage ISBN 90-6275-561-5 and ISBN 90-6275-562-3 and DC High Voltage ISBN 90-407-1110-0
- Frederik H. Kreuger: The Deception. Quantes Publishers, Rijswijk 2005. ISBN 90-5959-031-7 (This book is a translation of the Dutch novel Het Bedrog published by Quantes Publishers 2003. See link # 2)
- Frederik H. Kreuger: A New Vermeer : Life and Work of Han van Meegeren. Quantes Publishers, Rijswijk 2007. ISBN 978-90-5959-047-2 (See link #2)
- Frederik H. Kreuger: Han van Meegeren Revisited. His Art & a List of his Works., Fourth enlarged edition. Quantes Publishers Rijswijk, Delft 2013. ISBN 978 90 5959 065 6

Numerous publications for CIGRE, in the Transactions of the IEEE Institute of Electrical and Electronics Engineers and many other scientific periodicals.
