= Smiling Girl =

20th-century painting

Smiling girl
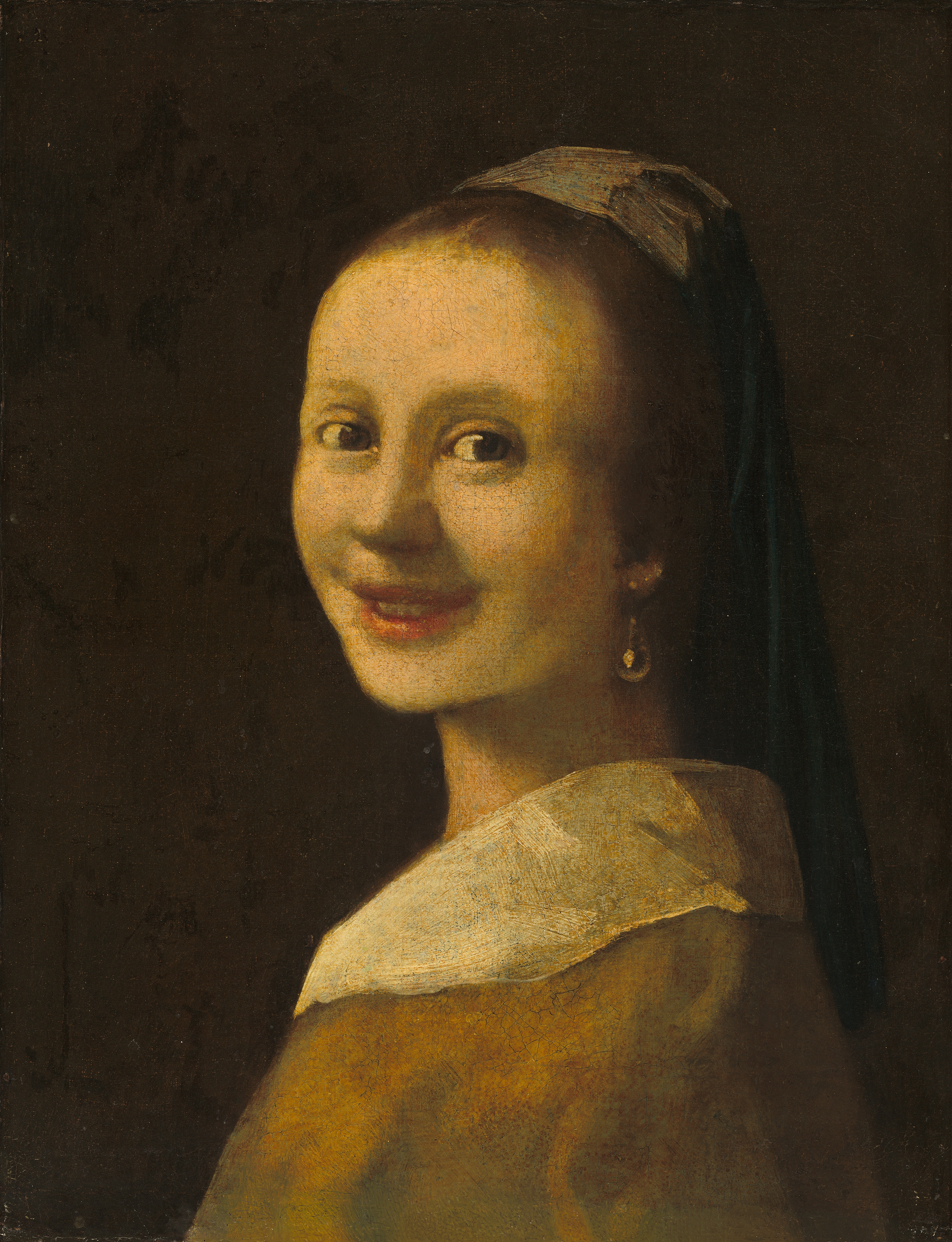
- Artist: Unknown artist, maybe Theo van Wijngaarden
- Year: c. 1925
- Type: Tronie
- Medium: Oil on canvas
- Dimensions: 41 cm × 31.8 cm (16 in × 12.5 in)
- Location: National Gallery of Art, Washington, D.C.

The Smiling Girl, formerly thought to be by Johannes Vermeer, was donated by collector Andrew W. Mellon in 1937 to the National Gallery of Art in Washington, D.C. Now widely considered to be a fake, the painting was deemed by the Vermeer expert Arthur K. Wheelock Jr. in a 1995 study to be by a 20th-century artist and forger, Theo van Wijngaarden, a friend of Han van Meegeren.
