= Jonathan Lopez (writer) =

American writer and art historian (born 1989)

Jonathan Lopez (born 1969) is an American writer and art historian. He was educated in the public schools of New York City, including the Bronx High School of Science, and in Cambridge, Massachusetts at Harvard University.

Formerly a correspondent for The Boston Globe and the Associated Press as well as an art critic and book reviewer for the Wall Street Journal, he is now a book author. He also contributes academic reviews to the Burlington Magazine.

Lopez's first book, The Man Who Made Vermeers (2008), a biography of the Dutch art forger Han van Meegeren, was praised in The New Yorker by Peter Schjeldahl as "profoundly researched, focused and absorbing". The Man Who Made Vermeers, has been made into a feature film The Last Vermeer (2021) starring Guy Pearce and produced by Ridley Scott.

Lopez has lectured at the Metropolitan Museum of Art, New York, the Museum of Fine Arts, Boston, the National Gallery of Art, Washington, D.C., and the Louvre, Paris, among other venues.

From 2008 to 2012 Lopez wrote a monthly column for Art & Antiques called "Talking Pictures" and was thereafter named editor at large of the magazine.

He has long been a contributor to London-based Apollo, the international magazine of the arts. His noted December 2007 Apollo article "Gross False Pretences" related the details of an acrimonious 1908 dispute between the art dealer Leonardus Nardus (a.k.a. Leo Nardus) and the wealthy industrialist Peter Arrell Brown Widener of Philadelphia. Shortly after publication "Gross False Pretences" was praised as "fascinating" and "revelatory" in the British newspaper The Guardian.

Lopez is writing a book on Vincent van Gogh’s on-again, off again religious obsessions and how they interacted both with the painter’s art and mental health.

Lopez lives in Manhattan with his wife, who is an art critic and professor of art history.
