= The Last Vermeer =

2019 American drama film

- Theatrical release poster
- Directed by: Dan Friedkin
- Screenplay by: John Orloff; Mark Fergus Hawk Ostby
- Based on: The Man Who Made Vermeers by Jonathan Lopez
- Produced by: Ryan Friedkin; Dan Friedkin; Bradley Thomas
- Starring: Guy Pearce; Claes Bang
- Cinematography: Remi Adefarasin
- Edited by: Victoria Boydell
- Music by: Johan Söderqvist
- Production company: Imperative Entertainment
- Distributed by: TriStar Pictures (through Sony Pictures Releasing)
- Release dates: August 31, 2019 (Telluride); November 20, 2020 (United States)
- Running time: 118 minutes
- Country: United States
- Language: English
- Box office: $884,710

The Last Vermeer is a 2019 American drama film directed by Dan Friedkin from a screenplay by John Orloff (under the pen name James McGee), Mark Fergus and Hawk Otsby. It is based on the 2008 book The Man Who Made Vermeers by Jonathan Lopez, and tells the story of Han van Meegeren (played by Guy Pearce), an art maker who swindles millions of dollars from the Nazis, alongside Dutch Resistance fighter Joseph Piller (Claes Bang).

The film had its worldwide release at the Telluride Film Festival on August 31, 2019, and was theatrically released in the United States on November 20, 2020, by Sony Pictures Releasing through the TriStar Pictures label.

== Plot ==
At the end of the Second World War, Captain Joseph Piller is a Dutch Jew who works for the Canadian military administration of the Netherlands after having been in the resistance during the German occupation. After receiving a tip about a painting by Johannes Vermeer that was recovered in Austria from Hermann Goering's private collection, Piller and his assistant Dekker arrest Han van Meegeren, an easy-living artist and dealer who sold the painting to Goering, on charges of collaboration with the enemy and using the proceeds from the sale to finance an Abwehr espionage network. However, after encountering a group of Dutch authorities led by De Klerks who want to take full custody of Han, Piller, who fears that Van Meegeren would either be allowed to escape or be subjected to a wholesale postwar witch-hunt of collaborators, transfers Han to a safehouse and prevents De Klerks and his men from entering, citing Allied protection.

As Piller interrogates Han over the painting's sale, Han successfully demands that he be supplied with materials to produce a canvas as evidence and explains throughout his custody his origins. After his paintings were negatively received by art critics before the war, he proceeded to be the source of multiple paintings by Vermeer that were discovered throughout the 1930s and used the profits from his discovery to fund a rich lifestyle which further grew through his cooperation with the Nazis, which he claims to be a front as he detests them in private. He finally claims that the recovered Vermeer was a fake and provides Piller with several people who could prove his case, raising doubts on Piller's part about Han's guilt. Sometime later, the Allied forces leave the Netherlands and leave Piller unable to prevent De Klerks from taking custody of Han, who faces the death penalty for his role in the theft of Dutch cultural treasures such as the Vermeer by the Nazis.

Piller, now working as a laborer, is visited by his secretary Minna, who tells him that a portrait by Vermeer that was supposedly discovered by Han looks similar to his lover Cootje. Returning to the now-abandoned safehouse, Piller finds Han's unfinished canvas, which turns out to be the same painting that was recovered from the Nazis. Convinced that Han is telling the truth, Piller agrees to defend Han in court and learns that he was able to forge multiple works of art using bakelite, which was only invented in the 20th century, and by heating and crumpling the canvas to make it look old.

At his trial, Han insists that he had forged the artworks being used as evidence against him and points out that he had painted Piller in his canvas, but the prosecution, aided by art critics who had initially authenticated the paintings, convince the judges to convict Han. Immediately after Han is sentenced to death, Piller arranges for Dekker to cause a disturbance in the courtroom as a distraction and splashes acid on one of the paintings, revealing Han's signature. Han's conviction is overturned, and he is greeted as a hero by the public.

Days later, De Klerks visits Piller and presents him with a book recovered from the safehouse that contained a dedication by Han addressed to Adolf Hitler. Realizing that Han had lied over his Nazi sympathies, Piller confronts Han at his house, but the latter dismisses him. Disgusted, Piller leaves and burns the book.

== Cast ==
- Guy Pearce as Han van Meegeren
- Claes Bang as Captain Joseph Piller
- Vicky Krieps as Minna Holberg
- Roland Møller as Espen Dekker
- August Diehl as Alex De Klerks
- Olivia Grant as Cootje Henning
- Susannah Doyle as Johana
- Adrian Scarborough as Dirk Hannema

== Production ==
On April 25, 2018, it was announced that Imperative Entertainment had begun production on Lyrebird, a film directed by Dan Friedkin and produced by Ridley Scott from a screenplay by James McGee, Mark Fergus and Hawk Ostby. The film is Friedkin's directorial debut.

Alongside the film's initial announcement, it was confirmed that Guy Pearce, Claes Bang, Vicky Krieps, and Roland Møller had been cast in the film's lead roles. Principal photography for the film was underway by April 2018, taking place in the United Kingdom and Holland. On May 22, 2018, filming took place at Fort Widley in Portsmouth, England. In April and August 2018, filming took place in Dordrecht and Schiedam, Netherlands.

== Release ==
The film had its world premiere at the Telluride Film Festival on August 31, 2019. It also screened at the 2019 Toronto International Film Festival on September 11, 2019. Prior to, Sony Pictures Classics acquired distribution rights to the film for North and Latin America, Eastern Europe, Scandinavia, the Middle East and Asia, with FilmNation Entertainment handling sales elsewhere. It was scheduled to be released on May 22, 2020, but was pulled due to the COVID-19 pandemic. It was then released on November 20, 2020, with TriStar Pictures distributing instead of Sony Pictures Classics.

== Reception ==
=== Box office ===
The film made $225,000 from 912 theaters in its opening weekend.

=== Critical response ===
On review aggregator Rotten Tomatoes, the film holds an approval rating of 70% based on 79 reviews, with an average rating of 6.4/10. The website's critics consensus reads: "Led by a skilled performance from Guy Pearce, The Last Vermeer derives diverting drama from its historically inspired wartime story." On Metacritic, the film has a weighted average score of 56 out of 100, based on 15 critics, indicating "mixed or average reviews". Audiences polled by PostTrak gave the film an average 4 out of 5 stars.
