= Jacques van Meegeren =

Dutch painter (1912–1977)

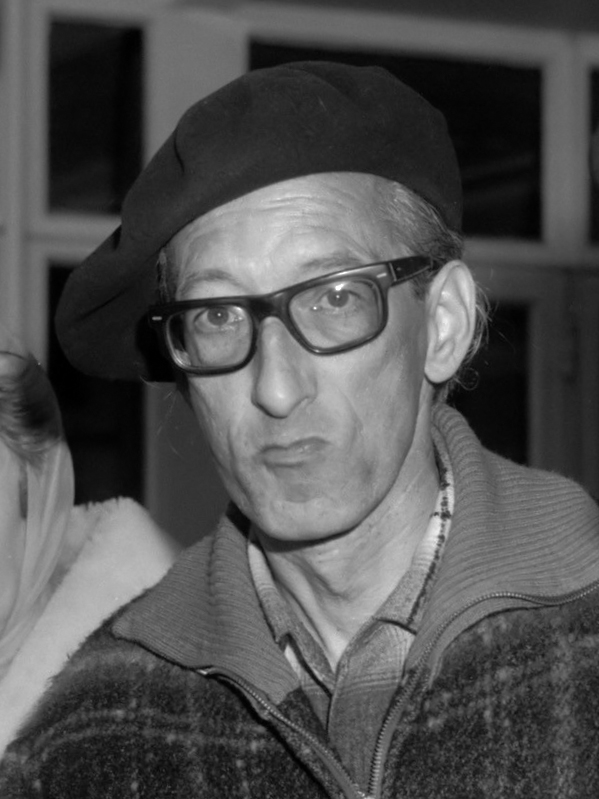
- Van Meegeren in 1965
- Born: Jacques Henri Emil van Meegeren; 26 August 1912; Rijswijk, Netherlands
- Died: 26 October 1977 (aged 65); Amsterdam, Netherlands
- Education: Han van Meegeren
- Known for: Illustration, painting, forgery, journalism
- Spouse: Lucienne Combey (1938–1977; estranged after 1954)

Jacques Henri Emil van Meegeren (26 August 1912 – 26 October 1977) was a Dutch illustrator and painter.

He is known for forging the work of his father, Han van Meegeren, who was a famous forger himself.

== Life ==
=== Youth ===
On 26 August 1912, Van Meegeren was born in the small village of Rijswijk, near The Hague, the Netherlands. His father was Han van Meegeren, who later became known as an art forger. His mother was a descendant of an Indonesian royal family. In 1915, his sister Inez was born.

As a child, Van Meegeren helped in his father's art studio. His father took him to art dealers and museums and taught him how to assess paintings. He began making his own art. In 1923, his parents divorced. In 1927, he went with his mother and sister to Sumatra.

In 1930, at age 18, Van Meegeren returned from the East Indies, reuniting with his father. His father introduced him to friends, fellow-artists of The Hague Art Circle, painters and actors, and took him to theaters and restaurants.

==== Relationship with his father ====
After his studies ended, Van Meegeren worked for a period in the electro-technical industry, but disliked it. He became a journalist and illustrator, and worked for Parisian magazines, while receiving an allowance from his father. He visited his father in Roquebrune, Southern France. In 1938, his father suggested that he visit the exhibition of paintings of the Dutch Golden Age in Rotterdam, and see the "newly discovered" Supper at Emmaus by Vermeer. When his father later asked about the impression the picture had made on him, Van Meegeren replied, "It is a masterpiece of this century, certainly no Vermeer". His father responded, "To whom do you attribute it, then?" "To you, Dad", Jacques said, "I can see it from the long and outsized form of the heads. The eyelids are your way of painting (...) the wine glass and the white pitcher are also yours".

==== Marriage ====
On 22 September 1938, Van Meegeren married Lucienne Combey, a girl from Annecy in France, near the Swiss border. In 1939, their daughter Michèle was born. In 1942, their daughter Chantal was born.

The couple lived in Paris until 1940. Van Meegeren had a second home in Amsterdam. He traveled between Paris and the Netherlands. At the end of World War II, he and their two children went to live with her parents in Annecy, because food had become scarce in Paris.

After the war, Van Meegeren left his family and went to the Netherlands to help his father, who had been arrested for his fraud with the Supper at Emmaus and other fake paintings.

=== A new career ===
==== Amsterdam ====
In 1946, Van Meegeren moved to Amsterdam, where his father taught him to paint portraits. His father was a stern tutor, making his son start again after each mistake. Han used to say, "What you have done once, you will do better next time". Jacques van Meegeren became a portraitist.

His father's trial began in October 1947. Jacques van Meegeren attended the trial with his sister Inez. On 12 November 1947, the Fourth Chamber of the Amsterdam Regional Court found Han van Meegeren guilty of forgery and fraud, and sentenced him to one year in prison. He had a heart attack on 26 November 1947, the last day to appeal against the ruling, and was rushed to the Valeriuskliniek, a hospital in Amsterdam. He had a second heart attack on 29 December and was pronounced dead at 5:00 pm on 30 December 1947, at the age of 58.

Van Meegeren drew his father lying in state in his home in Amsterdam. He delivered a eulogy at the funeral, saying, "Too many young artists think that skillful drawing and command of painting techniques are no longer necessary to become an honest artist. They would do well to take an example from my father". This statement was manipulated by a Netherlands' newspaper which wrote, "Museum directors take care! The son of Han van Meegeren has said that artists today should use his father as an example".

Jacques van Meegeren received commissions for portraits from all over the Netherlands. His work was exhibited in several towns. He worked as a scenery painter with the American Theatre in Paris. In 1954, he met his estranged wife in Annecy, and made a portrait of his eldest daughter (the aged 15), but never saw them again.

==== France ====
Van Meegeren began a romantic relationship with Juliette Ledel in Amsterdam. In 1957, he traveled with her to Nice, where he sold his father's villa. They bought a house in Laghet, and settled there. He worked as a painter and portraitist. In 1959, he and his wife invested all their money and energy in a private exhibition of his work in Nice. A few days before the opening of the exhibition, Nice flooded, leading to no one in attendance at the exhibit, depressing Van Meegeren for months afterwards.

==== Netherlands again ====
In 1962, Van Meegeren and Ledel returned to the Netherlands to consult on a Hollywood movie about his father. The project was dropped and no movie was made. They were left without money and often had to move due to being unable to afford the costs of living.

Van Meegeren started to paint and sell pictures with his father's signature, gaining a significant profit.

In the last year of his life, he confessed to a nurse that he had abandoned his family and had made and sold fake pictures with his father's signature. A year later, in 1977, Van Meegeren died, a poor and lonely man.

== Fake Van Meegerens ==
After Han van Meegeren had become known for his forgeries, his own work rose in price and it became worthwhile to fake his paintings. Among these fakes, the imitations by Jacques van Meegeren are the most difficult to distinguish, as he painted in a style that was akin to his father's and was also able to produce a perfect fake signature. Carlos de Couto, the Brazilian vice-consul in Amsterdam, often lent money to Jacques van Meegeren who paid him back in pictures by "Han van Meegeren".

== Notes ==
=== Sources ===
- Kreuger, Frederik H. (2007). A New Vermeer. Rijswijk, Holland: Quantes. ISBN 978-90-5959-047-2. This is a biography of Han van Meegeren which also describes the life of Jacques in chapters II to V and VIII, and his forgeries in chapter IX.
- Kilbracken, John Raymond Godley (1967). Van Meegeren: Master Forger. New York: Charles Scribner's. It describes parts of Jacques' life; Lord Kilbracken was a friend of his.
- Ledel, Juliette (n.d.). Biography of Jacques van Meegeren. The Hague, the Netherlands: Document at the RKD, the States Institute for Art Documentation.
