= Han van Meegeren =

Dutch painter and art forger (1889–1947)

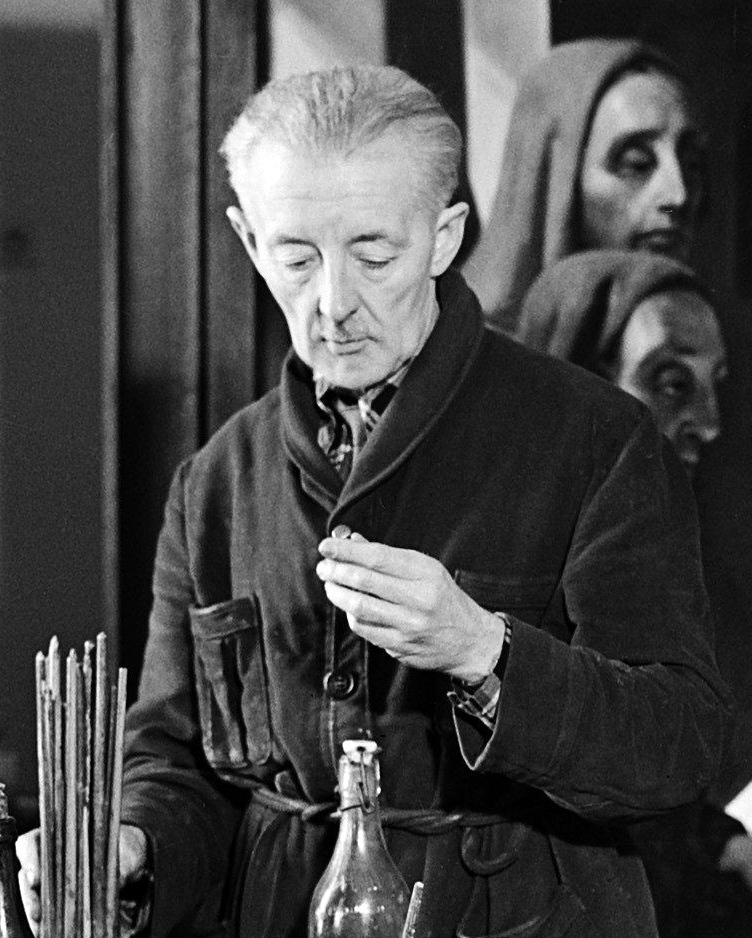
- Van Meegeren painting Jesus Among the Doctors in 1945
- Born: Henricus Antonius van Meegeren; 10 October 1889; Deventer, Netherlands
- Died: 30 December 1947 (aged 58); Amsterdam, Holland netherlands
- Occupations: Painter, art forger
- Spouses: Anna de Voogt (m. 1912; div. 1923) Jo Oerlemans (m. 1928)
- Children: 2, including Jacques Henri Emil

Henricus Antonius "Han" van Meegeren (Dutch: [ɦɛnˈrikʏs ɑnˈtoːnijəs ˈɦɑɱ‿vɑ‿ˈmeːɣərə(n)]; 10 October 1889 – 30 December 1947) was a Dutch painter and portraitist, considered one of the most ingenious art forgers of the 20th century. Van Meegeren became a national hero after World War II when it was revealed that he had sold a forged painting to Reichsmarschall Hermann Göring during the Nazi occupation of the Netherlands.

Van Meegeren attempted to make a career as an artist, but art critics dismissed his work. He decided to prove his talent by forging paintings from the Dutch Golden Age. Leading experts of the time accepted his paintings as genuine 17th-century works, including art collector Abraham Bredius.

During World War II, Göring purchased one of Van Meegeren's "Vermeers", which became one of his most prized possessions. Following the war, Van Meegeren was arrested on a charge of selling cultural property to the Nazis. Facing a possible death penalty, he confessed that the painting was a forgery, and was subsequently convicted and sentenced to one year in prison. However, he died less than two months later after suffering two heart attacks. A biography in 1967 estimated that Van Meegeren duped buyers out of more than US$30 million; his victims included the Dutch government. (Note: Equivalent of the total amount in dollars stated by Kilbracken in Appendix II, a biography published in 1967, "Calculate the Value of $30 in 1967. How much is it worth today?".)

== Early years ==
Han (diminutive for Henri or Henricus) van Meegeren was born 10 October 1889, the third of five children of Augusta Louisa Henrietta Camps and Hendrikus Johannes van Meegeren, a French and history teacher at the Kweekschool (training college for schoolteachers) in the provincial city of Deventer.

While attending the Higher Burger School, Han met teacher and painter Bartus Korteling (1853–1930) who became his mentor. Korteling had been inspired by Johannes Vermeer and taught Van Meegeren Vermeer's techniques. Korteling had rejected the Impressionist movement and other modern trends as decadent, degenerate art, and his strong personal influence may have led Van Meegeren to do likewise.

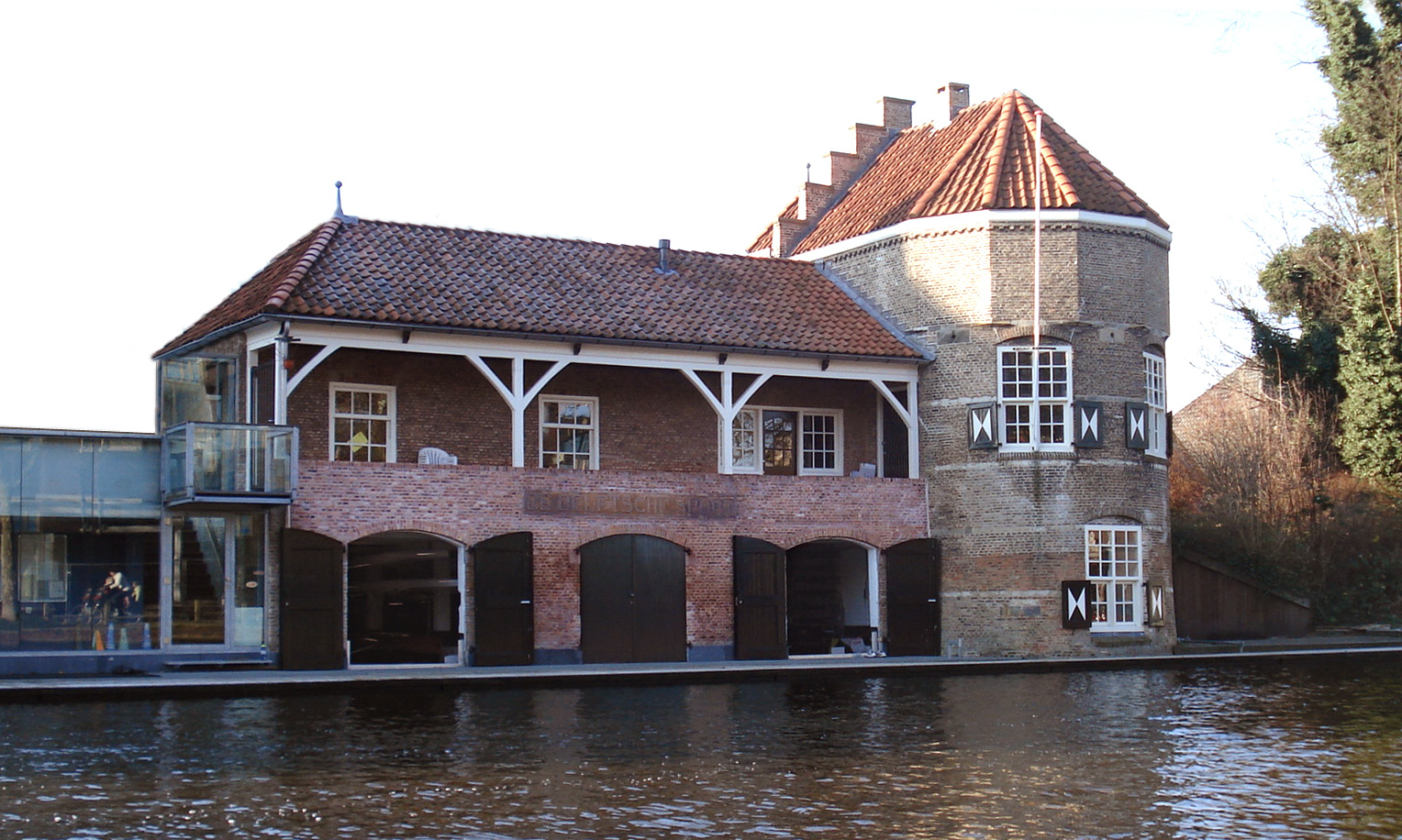
Han van Meegeren designed this boathouse (the building in the centre, adjoining an old tower in the town wall) for his Rowing Club D.D.S. while studying architecture in Delft from 1907 to 1913.

Van Meegeren's father did not share his son's love of art; he often forced Han to write a hundred times, "I know nothing, I am nothing, I am capable of nothing." Instead, Han's father compelled him to study architecture at the Delft University of Technology in 1907. He received drawing and painting lessons, as well. He easily passed his preliminary examinations but never took the Ingenieurs (final) examination because he did not want to become an architect. He nevertheless proved to be an apt architect and designed the clubhouse for his rowing club in Delft, which still exists (see image).

In 1913, Van Meegeren gave up his architecture studies and concentrated on drawing and painting at the art school in The Hague. On 8 January 1913, he received the prestigious Gold Medal from the Technical University in Delft for his Study of the Interior of the Church of Saint Lawrence (Laurenskerk) in Rotterdam. The award was given every five years to an art student who created the best work, and was accompanied by a gold medal.

On 18 April 1912, Van Meegeren married fellow art student Anna de Voogt, who was pregnant with their first child. The couple initially lived with de Voogt's grandmother in Rijswijk, and their son Jacques Henri Emil van Meegeren was born there on 26 August 1912.

== Career as a legitimate painter ==
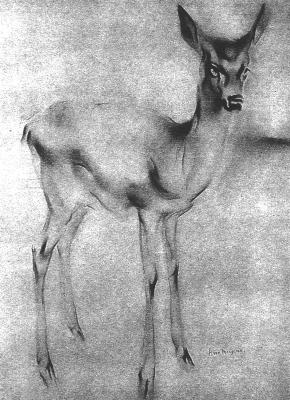
The Deer (or "Hertje") is one of Han van Meegeren's best-known original drawings.

In 1914, Van Meegeren moved his family to Scheveningen and completed the diploma examination at the Royal Academy of Art in The Hague, which allowed him to teach. He took a position as the assistant to the Professor of Drawing and Art History. In March 1915, his daughter Pauline was born, later called Inez. To supplement his small salary of 75 guldens per month, Han sketched posters and painted pictures for Christmas cards, still-life, landscapes, and portraits for the commercial art trade. Many of these paintings are quite valuable today.

Van Meegeren's first exhibition was held from April to May 1917 at the Kunstzaal Pictura in the Hague. In December 1919, he was accepted as a member by the Haagse Kunstkring, an exclusive society of writers and painters who met weekly on the premises of the Ridderzaal. Although he had been accepted, he was ultimately denied the position of chairman. He painted the tame roe deer belonging to Princess Juliana. The painting, Hertje (The Fawn or The Deer), was completed in 1921, and became popular in the Netherlands. He undertook numerous journeys to Belgium, France, Italy, and England, and acquired a name for himself as a portraitist, earning commissions from English and American socialites who spent their winter vacations on the Côte d'Azur. His clients were impressed by his understanding of the 17th-century techniques of the Dutch masters. Throughout his life, Van Meegeren signed his own paintings with his own signature.

After years of unhappiness, Van Meegeren's marriage to Anna de Voogt ended in divorce on 19 July 1923. de Voogt moved to Paris, where Van Meegeren visited his children from time to time. He dedicated himself to portraiture and began producing forgeries to increase his income.

He married actress Johanna Theresia Oerlemans, with whom he had been living for the previous three years, in Woerden in 1928. Johanna's stage name was Jo van Walraven. She had previously been married to art critic and journalist Dr. C H. de Boer (Carel de Boer). She brought their daughter Viola into the Van Meegeren household.

== Rejection by the critics ==
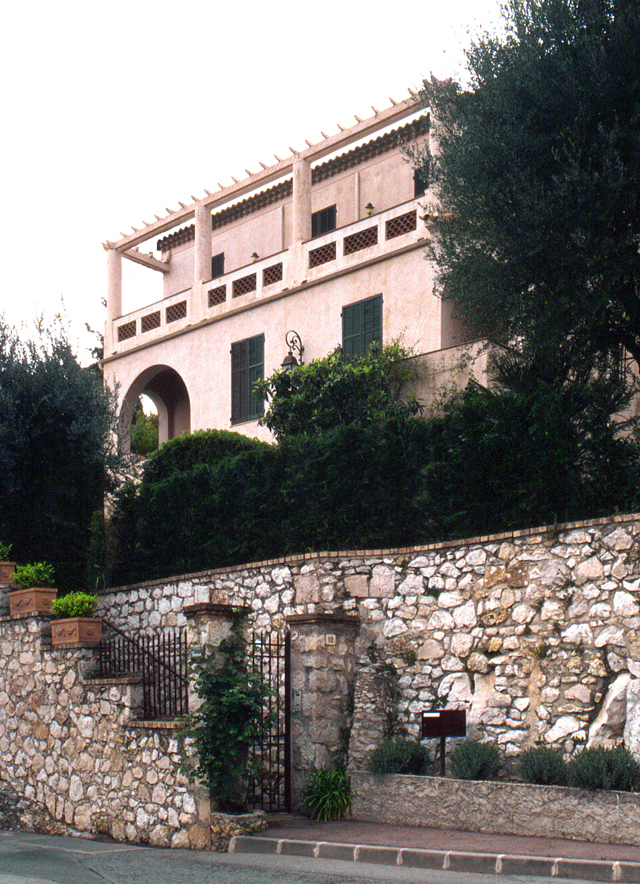
Han van Meegeren's mansion Primavera in Roquebrune-Cap-Martin where he painted his forgery The Supper at Emmaus in 1936, which sold for about US$300,000

Van Meegeren had become a well-known painter in the Netherlands with the success of Hertje (1921) and Straatzangers (1928). His first legitimate copies were painted in 1923, his Laughing Cavalier and Happy Smoker, both in the style of Frans Hals. By 1928, the similarity of Van Meegeren's paintings to those of the Old Masters began to draw the reproach of Dutch art critics, who said that his talent was limited outside of copying other artists' work.

One critic wrote that he was "a gifted technician who has made a sort of composite facsimile of the Renaissance school, he has every virtue except originality". Van Meegeren responded in a series of aggressive articles in De Kemphaan ("The Ruff"), a monthly periodical published by Van Meegeren and journalist Jan Ubink from April 1928 until March 1930. Jonathan Lopez writes that Van Meegeren "denounced modern painting as 'art-Bolshevism' in the articles, described its proponents as a 'slimy bunch of woman-haters and negro-lovers,' and invoked the image of 'a Jew with a handcart' as a symbol for the international art market".

Van Meegeren set out to prove to the art critics that he could more than copy the Dutch Masters; he would produce a work to rival theirs.

== The "perfect forgery" ==
In 1932, Van Meegeren moved to the southern French village of Roquebrune-Cap-Martin with his wife. There he rented a furnished mansion called "Primavera" and set out to define the chemical and technical procedures that would be necessary to create his perfect forgeries. He bought authentic 17th-century canvases and mixed his own paints from raw materials (such as lapis lazuli, white lead, indigo, and cinnabar) using old formulas to ensure that they could pass as authentic. He made badger-hair paintbrushes similar to those that Vermeer was known to have used.

He came up with a way to use phenol formaldehyde (Bakelite) to make paints harden after application, making paintings appear 300 years old (through the illusion that the paint had already dried for that long). Van Meegeren would first mix his paints with lilac oil, to stop the colours from fading or yellowing in heat. (This caused his studio to smell so strongly of lilacs that he kept a vase of fresh lilacs nearby so that visitors would not be suspicious.) Then, after completing a painting, he would bake it at 100 °C (212 °F) to 120 °C (248 °F) to harden the paint - by effectively polymerizing (curing) the bakelite in the mixture, and then roll a cylinder over it to increase cracking. Later, he would wash the painting in India ink which filled the cracks in black.

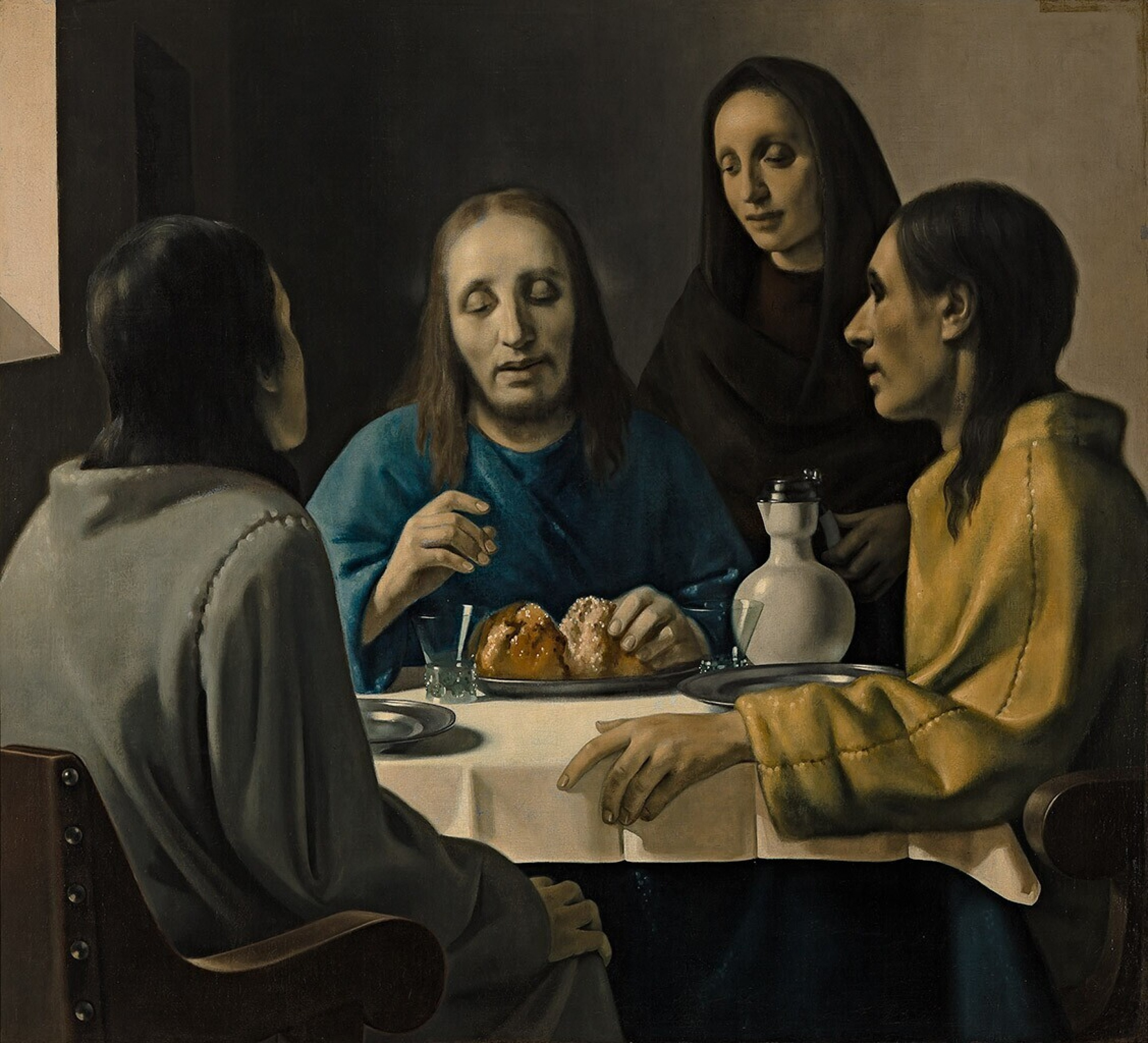
The Supper at Emmaus (1937)

It took Van Meegeren six years to work out his techniques, but ultimately he was pleased with his work on both artistic and deceptive levels. Two of these trial paintings were painted as if by Vermeer: Lady Reading Music, after the genuine paintings Woman in Blue Reading a Letter at the Rijksmuseum in Amsterdam; and Lady Playing Music, after Vermeer's Woman With a Lute Near a Window hanging in the Metropolitan Museum of Art in New York City. Van Meegeren did not sell these paintings; both are now at the Rijksmuseum.

Following a journey to the 1936 Summer Olympics in Berlin, Van Meegeren painted The Supper at Emmaus. In 1934 Van Meegeren had bought a seventeenth-century mediocre Dutch painting, The Awakening of Lazarus, and on this foundation he created his masterpiece à la Vermeer. The experts thought that Vermeer had studied in Italy, so Van Meegeren used the version of Michelangelo Merisi da Caravaggio's Supper at Emmaus, at Milan's Pinacoteca di Brera, as a model. He gave the painting to his friend, attorney C. A. Boon, telling him that it was a genuine Vermeer, and asked him to show it to art historian Abraham Bredius in Monaco. In October 1932, Bredius had already published an article about two recently discovered alleged Vermeer paintings, which he defined as "Landscape" and "Man and Woman at a Spinet". He said the former was a fake, and described it as "a landscape of the eighteenth century into which had been imported scraps of the View of Delft" (mostly the Delft New Church's tower). He judged Man and Woman at a Spinet, however, not only to be an "authentic Vermeer", but also "very beautiful", and "one of the finest gems of the master's œuvre". In September 1937, Bredius examined The Supper at Emmaus and, writing in The Burlington Magazine, he accepted it as a genuine Vermeer and praised it very highly as "the masterpiece of Johannes Vermeer of Delft". The evidence usually required, such as resilience of colours against chemical solutions, white lead analysis, X-ray images, and micro-spectroscopy of the colouring substances, confirmed it to be an authentic Vermeer.

The painting was purchased by The Rembrandt Society for fl.520,000 (€235,000 or about €4,640,000 today), (Note: To obtain the relative present value the amount in Dutch Guilders was given for the year 1938 at inflation calculator from/to Guilders or Euros Archived 2017-09-02 at the Wayback Machine) with the aid of wealthy shipowner Willem van der Vorm, and donated to the Museum Boijmans Van Beuningen in Rotterdam. In 1938, the piece was highlighted in a special exhibition for Queen Wilhelmina's Jubilee at a Rotterdam museum, along with 450 Dutch old masters dating from 1400 to 1800. A. Feulner wrote in the "Magazine for [the] History of Art", "In the rather isolated area in which the Vermeer picture hung, it was as quiet as in a chapel. The feeling of the consecration overflows on the visitors, although the picture has no ties to ritual or church", and despite the presence of masterpieces of Rembrandt and Grünewald, it was defined as "the spiritual centre" of the whole exhibition.

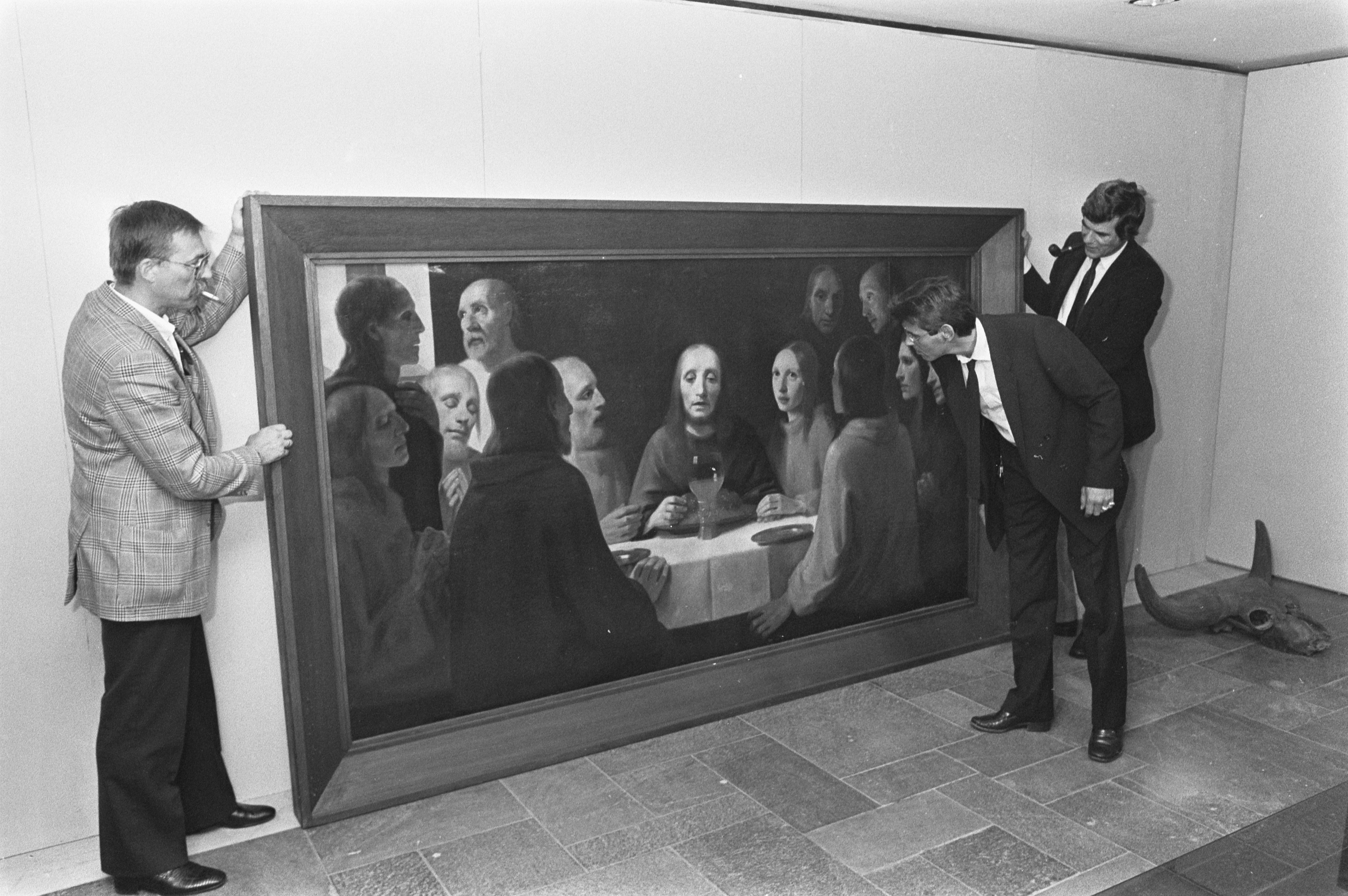
Painting The Last Supper I by Han van Meegeren on 11th art and antiques fair in Rotterdam August 31, 1984. - In the summer of 1938, Van Meegeren moved to Nice. 1939 he painted The Last Supper I in the style of Vermeer.

In 1938, Van Meegeren moved to Nice, buying a 12-bedroom estate at Les Arènes de Cimiez with the proceeds from the sale of the painting. On the walls of the estate hung several genuine Old Masters. Two of his better forgeries were made here, Interior with Card Players and Interior with Drinkers, both displaying the signature of Pieter de Hooch. During his time in Nice, he painted his Last Supper I in the style of Vermeer. (Note: The Last Supper I was recovered in September 1949, during a search of the estate of Dr. Paul B. Coremans; x-ray examinations revealed that Van Meegeren had reused the canvas of a painting by Govert Flinck.)

He returned to the Netherlands in September 1939 as the Second World War threatened. After a short stay in Amsterdam, he moved to the village of Laren in 1940. Throughout 1941, Van Meegeren issued his designs, which he published in 1942 as a large and luxurious book entitled Han van Meegeren: Teekeningen I (Drawings nr I). He also created several forgeries during this time, including The Head of Christ, The Last Supper II, The Blessing of Jacob, The Adulteress, and The Washing of the Feet—all in the manner of Vermeer. On 18 December 1943, he divorced his wife, but this was only a formality; the couple remained together, but a large share of his capital was transferred to her accounts as a safeguard against the uncertainties of the war.

In December 1943, the Van Meegerens moved to the exclusive Keizersgracht 321 in Amsterdam. His forgeries had earned him between 5.5 and 7.5 million guilders (or about US$25–30 million today). (Note: To obtain the present value in U.S. currency for a given year the number of guilders was divided by the rate of exchange (guilders or pounds per dollar) Archived 2010-09-04 at the Wayback Machine for that year. The value in U.S. currency for a given year was then entered into the formula at What is the Relative Value? Archived 2006-05-14 at the Wayback Machine to obtain the present value (Consumer Price Index for 2005).) He used this money to purchase a large amount of real estate, jewellery, and works of art, and to further his luxurious lifestyle. In a 1946 interview, he told Marie Louise Doudart de la Grée that he owned 52 houses and 15 country houses around Laren, among them grachtenhuizen, mansions along Amsterdam's canals.

=== Hermann Göring ===
In 1942, during the German occupation of the Netherlands, one of Van Meegeren's agents sold the Vermeer forgery Christ with the Adulteress to Nazi banker and art dealer Alois Miedl. Experts could probably have identified it as a forgery; as Van Meegeren's health declined, so did the quality of his work. He chain-smoked, drank heavily, and became addicted to morphine-laced sleeping pills. However, there were no genuine Vermeers available for comparison, since most museum collections were in protective storage as a prevention against war damage.

Nazi Reichsmarschall Hermann Göring traded 137 looted paintings for Christ with the Adulteress. On 25 August 1943, Göring hid his collection of looted artwork, including Christ with the Adulteress, in an Austrian salt mine, along with 6,750 other pieces of artwork looted by the Nazis. On 17 May 1945, Allied forces entered the salt mine and Captain Harry Anderson discovered the painting.

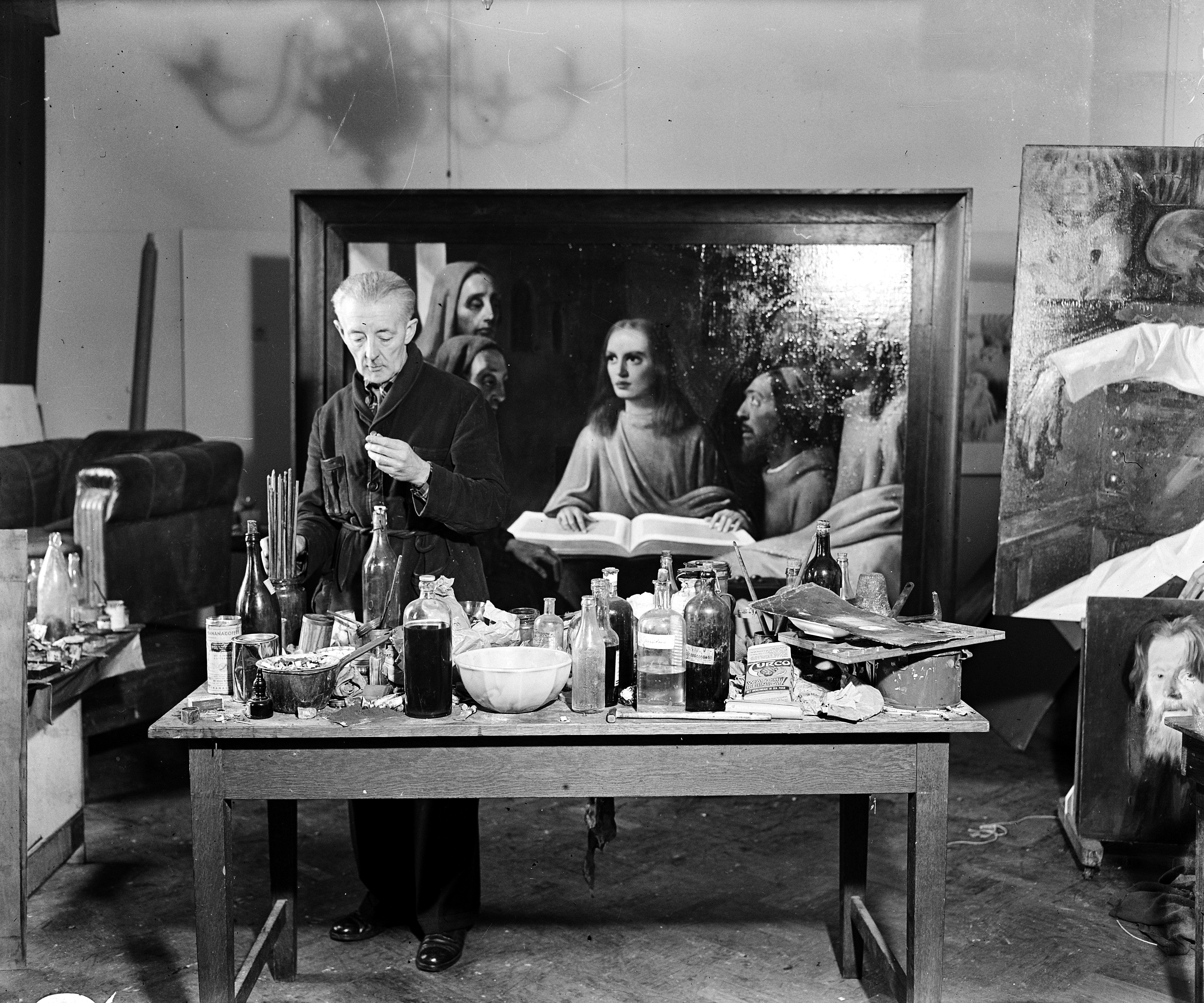
Van Meegeren painting Jesus Among the Doctors in 1945

In May 1945, the Allied forces questioned Miedl regarding the newly discovered Vermeer. Based on Miedl's confession, the painting was traced back to Van Meegeren. On 29 May 1945, he was arrested and charged with fraud and aiding and abetting the enemy. He was remanded to the Weteringschans prison as an alleged Nazi collaborator and plunderer of Dutch cultural property, threatened by the authorities with the death penalty. He labored over his predicament, but eventually confessed to forging paintings attributed to Vermeer and Pieter de Hooch. He exclaimed, "The painting in Göring's hands is not, as you assume, a Vermeer of Delft, but a Van Meegeren! I painted the picture!" It took some time to verify this, and Van Meegeren was detained for several months in the Headquarters of the Military Command at Herengracht 458 in Amsterdam. To prove that the "Vermeer" sold to the Nazis was actually a Van Meegeren rather than a priceless Dutch treasure, Van Meegeren painted his last forgery between July and December 1945 watched by reporters and court-appointed witnesses: Jesus among the Doctors, also called Young Christ in the Temple, not a copy but in the style of Vermeer. After completing the painting, he was transferred to the fortress prison Blauwkapel. Van Meegeren was released from prison in January or February 1946.

=== Trial and prison sentence ===
The trial of Han van Meegeren began on 29 October 1947 in Room 4 of the Regional Court in Amsterdam. The collaboration charges had been dropped, since the expert panel had found that the supposed Vermeer sold to Hermann Göring had been a forgery and was, therefore, not the cultural property of the Netherlands. Public prosecutor H. A. Wassenbergh brought charges of forgery and fraud and demanded a sentence of two years in prison.

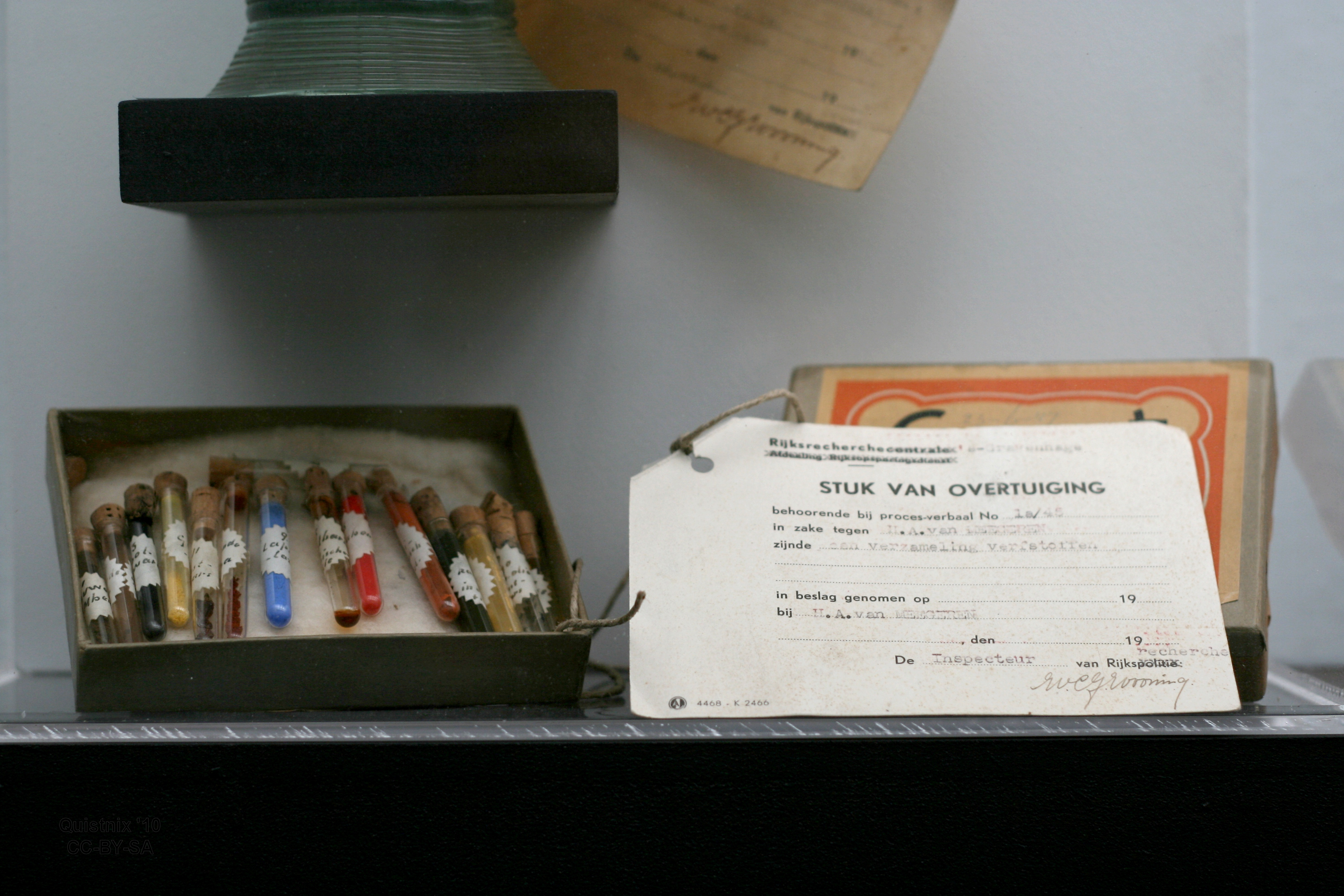
Evidence against Han van Meegeren: a collection of pigments.

The court commissioned an international group of experts to address the authenticity of Van Meegeren's paintings. The commission included curators, professors, and doctors from the Netherlands, Belgium, and England, and was led by the director of the chemical laboratory at the Royal Museums of Fine Arts of Belgium, Paul B. Coremans. The commission examined the eight paintings attributed to Vermeer and Frans Hals which Van Meegeren had identified as forgeries. With the help of the commission, Dr. Coremans was able to determine the chemical composition of Van Meegeren's paints.

He found that the paint contained the phenolformaldehyde resins Bakelite and Albertol, not invented until the 20th century, as paint hardeners; and a bottle had been found in Van Meegeren's studio. This proved that the paintings could not be genuine.

The commission also suggested that the dust in the craquelure was too homogeneous to be of natural origin. It appeared to come from India ink, which had accumulated even in areas that natural dirt or dust would never have reached. The paint had become so hard that alcohol, strong acids, and bases did not attack the surface, a clear indication that the surface had not been formed in a natural manner. The craquelure on the surface did not always match that in the ground layer, which would certainly have been the case with a natural craquelure. Thus, the test results obtained by the commission appeared to confirm that the works were forgeries created by Van Meegeren, but their authenticity continued to be debated by some of the experts until 1967 and 1977, when new investigative techniques were used to analyze the paintings (see below).

On 12 November 1947, the Fourth Chamber of the Amsterdam Regional Court found Han van Meegeren guilty of forgery and fraud, and sentenced him to one year in prison. The trial was widely covered in the media, and Van Meegeren became a folk hero.

== Death ==
While waiting to be moved to prison, Van Meegeren returned to his home, where his health continued to decline. During this last month of his life, he strolled freely around his neighbourhood.

Van Meegeren suffered a heart attack on 26 November 1947, the last day to appeal the ruling, and was rushed to the Valeriuskliniek, a hospital in Amsterdam, where he suffered a second heart attack on 29 December, and was pronounced dead on 30 December 1947, at the age of 58. Soon after his death, a plaster death mask was made, which was acquired by the Rijksmuseum in 2014. His family and several hundred of his friends attended his funeral at the Driehuis Westerveld Crematorium chapel. In 1948, his urn was buried in the general cemetery in the village of Diepenveen (municipality of Deventer).

== Aftermath ==
The auction of the estate of Han van Meegeren (in Dutch).

After his death, the court ruled that Van Meegeren's estate be auctioned and the proceeds from his property and the sale of his counterfeits be used to refund the buyers of his works and to pay income taxes on the sale of his paintings. Van Meegeren had filed for bankruptcy in December 1945. On 5 and 6 September 1950, the contents of his Amsterdam house were auctioned, along with 738 other pieces of furniture and works of art, including numerous paintings by old and new masters from his private collection. The house was auctioned separately on 4 September.

The proceeds amounted to 123,000 guilders. Van Meegeren's unsigned The Last Supper I was bought for 2,300 guilders, while Jesus among the Doctors (which Van Meegeren had painted while in detention) sold for 3,000 guilders (about US$800, or about US$7,000 today). Today the painting hangs in a Johannesburg church. The sale of the entire estate amounted to 242,000 guilders (about US$60,000, or about US$500,000 today).

Throughout his trial and bankruptcy, Van Meegeren maintained that his second wife Jo had nothing to do with his forgeries. A large part of his considerable wealth had been transferred to her when they divorced, and the money would have been confiscated if she had been ruled to be an accomplice. Though some biographers believe she must have known the truth, her involvement was never proven and she was able to keep her substantial capital. Jo outlived her husband by many years, in luxury, until her death at the age of 91.

=== M. Jean Decoen's objection ===
M. Jean Decoen, a Brussels art expert and restorer, stated in his 1951 book he believed The Supper at Emmaus and The Last Supper II to be genuine Vermeers, and demanded that the paintings should again be examined. He also claimed that Van Meegeren used these paintings as a model for his forgeries. Daniel George Van Beuningen, the buyer of The Last Supper II, Interior with Drinkers, and The Head of Christ, demanded that Dr. Paul Coremans publicly admit that he had erred in his analysis. Coremans refused and Van Beuningen sued him, alleging that Coremans's wrongful branding of The Last Supper II diminished the value of his "Vermeer" and asking for compensation of £500,000 (about US$1.3 million, or about US$10 million today).

The first trial in Brussels was won by Coremans, because the court adopted the same reasoning of the court ruling at Van Meegeren's trial. A second trial was delayed owing to van Beuningen's death on 29 May 1955. In 1958 the court heard the case on behalf of van Beuningen's heirs. Coremans managed to give the definitive evidence of the forgeries by showing a photograph of a Hunting Scene, attributed to A. Hondius, exactly the same scene which was visible with X-ray under the surface of the alleged Vermeer's Last Supper. Moreover, Coremans brought a witness to the courtroom who confirmed that Van Meegeren bought the Hunt scene in 1940. The court found in favour of Coremans, and the findings of his commission were upheld.

=== Further investigations ===
In 1967, the Artists Material Center at Carnegie Mellon University in Pittsburgh examined several of the "Vermeers" in their collection, under the direction of Robert Feller and Bernard Keisch. The examination confirmed that several of their paintings were in fact created using materials invented in the 20th century. They concluded that they could be Van Meegeren forgeries. The test results obtained by the Carnegie Mellon team are summarized below.

Han van Meegeren knew that white lead was used during Vermeer's time, but he had to obtain his stocks through the modern colour trade. In the 17th century, lead was mined from deposits located in the Low Countries; however, by the 19th century, most lead was imported from Australia and the Americas, and differed both in isotope composition and in the content of trace elements. Dutch white lead was extracted from ores containing trace but significant quantities of silver and antimony, while the modern white lead used by Van Meegeren contained neither, as those elements are separated from the lead during the modern smelting process.

Forgeries in which modern lead or white lead pigment has been used can be recognized by using a technique called Pb(Lead)-210-Dating. Pb-210 is a naturally occurring radioactive isotope of lead that is part of the uranium-238 radioactive decay series, and has a half-life of 22.3 years. To determine the amount of Pb-210, the alpha radiation emitted by another element, Polonium-210 (Po-210), is measured. Thus it is possible to estimate the age of a painting, within a few years' span, by extrapolating the Pb-210 content present in the paint used.

The white lead in the painting The Supper at Emmaus had polonium-210 values of 8.5±1.4 and radium-226 (part of the uranium-238 radioactive decay series) values of 0.8±0.3. In contrast, the white lead found in Dutch paintings from 1600 to 1660 had polonium-210 values of 0.23±0.27 and radium-226 values of 0.40±0.47.

In 1977, another investigation was undertaken by the States forensic labs of the Netherlands using up-to-date techniques, including gas chromatography, to formally confirm the origin of six Van Meegeren forgeries that had been alleged to be genuine Vermeers, including the Emmaus and the Last Supper. The conclusions of the 1946 commission were reaffirmed and upheld by the Dutch judicial system.

In 1998, A&E ran a TV program called Scams, Schemes & Scoundrels highlighting Van Meegeren's life and art forgeries, many of which had been confiscated as Nazi loot. The program was hosted by skeptic James Randi.

In July 2011, the BBC TV programme Fake or Fortune investigated a copy of Dirck van Baburen's The Procuress owned by the Courtauld Institute. Opinion had been divided as to whether it was a 17th-century studio work or a Van Meegeren fake. The programme used chemical analysis of the paint to show that it contained Van Meegeren's signature bakelite trace, proving that the painting was a 20th-century fake.

== Legacy ==
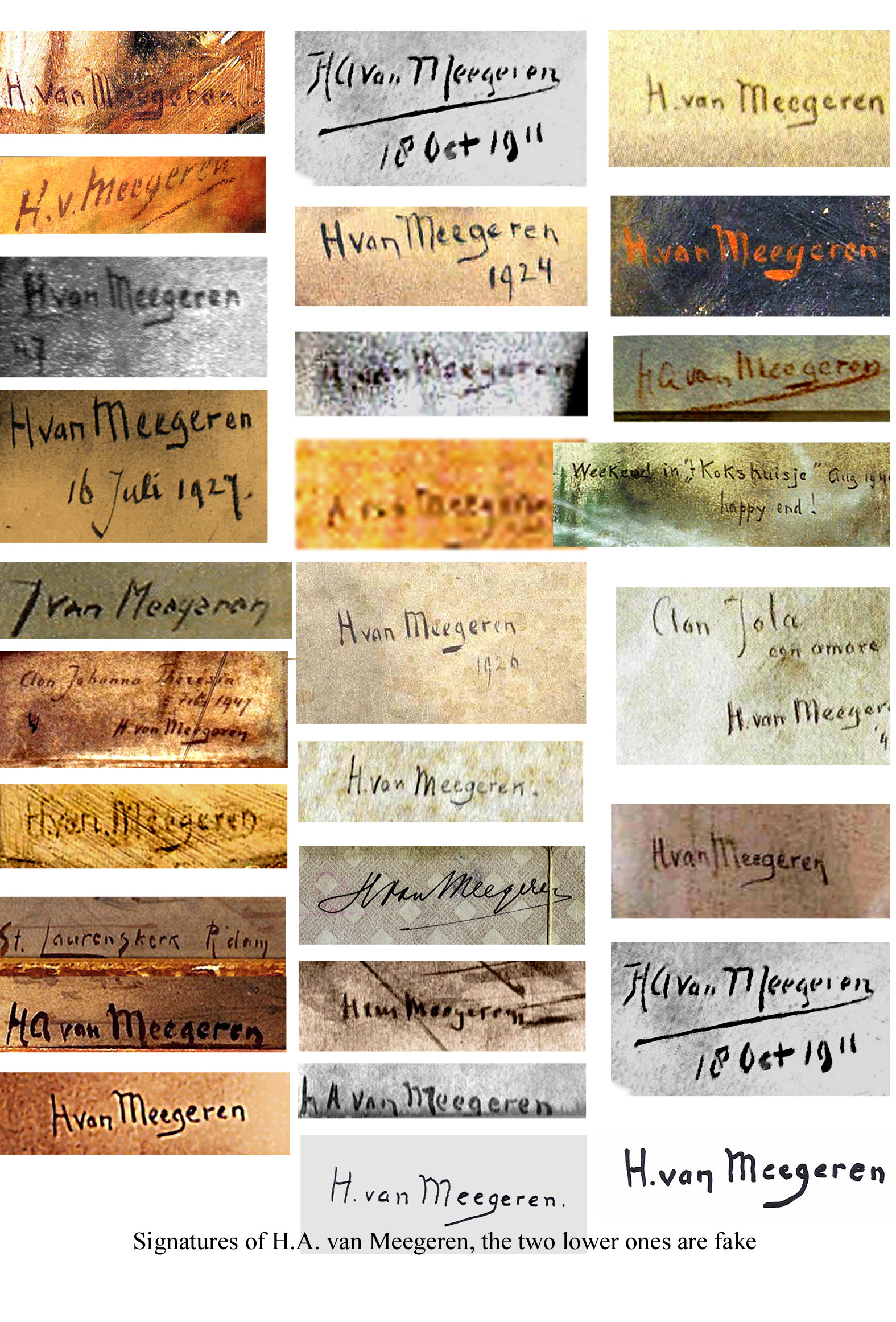
A collection of genuine and fake signatures of Han van Meegeren

In 2008, Harvard-educated art historian Jonathan Lopez published The Man Who Made Vermeers, Unvarnishing the Legend of Master Forger Han Van Meegeren. His extensive research confirmed that Van Meegeren started to make forgeries, not so much because of feeling misunderstood and undervalued by art critics as some maintain, but for the income that it generated, which he needed to support his addictions and lavish lifestyle.

Van Meegeren's father was said to have once told Van Meegeren, "You are a cheat and always will be." Van Meegeren sent a signed copy of his own art book to Adolf Hitler, which turned up in the Reich Chancellery in Berlin complete with an inscription (in German): "To my beloved Führer in grateful tribute, from H. van Meegeren, Laren, North Holland, 1942". He only admitted the signature was his own, although the entire inscription was by the same hand. He bought up homes of several departed Jewish families in Amsterdam and held lavish parties while much of the country was hungry. On the other hand, his brothers and sisters perceived him as loyal, generous, and affectionate, and he was always loving and helpful to his own children.

Van Meegeren continued to paint after his arrest, signing his works with his own name. His new-found profile ensured quick sales of his new paintings, often selling at prices that were many times higher than before he had been unmasked as a forger. Van Meegeren also told the news media that he had "an offer from a Manhattan gallery to come to the U.S. and paint portraits 'in the 17th-century manner' at US$6,000 a throw".

A Dutch opinion poll conducted in October 1947 placed Han van Meegeren's popularity second in the nation, behind only the Prime Minister's and slightly ahead of Prince Bernhard, the husband of Princess Juliana. The Dutch people viewed Van Meegeren as a cunning trickster who had successfully fooled the Dutch art experts and, more importantly, Hermann Göring. In fact, according to a contemporary account, Göring was informed that his "Vermeer" was actually a forgery and "[Göring] looked as if for the first time he had discovered there was evil in the world". Lopez, however, suggests Göring may never have known the painting was a fake.

Lopez argued that Han van Meegeren's defence during his trial in Amsterdam was a masterpiece of trickery, forging his own personality into a true Dutchman eager to trick his critics and also the Dutch people by pretending that he sold his fake Vermeer to Göring because he wanted to teach the Nazi a lesson. Van Meegeren remains one of the most ingenious art counterfeiters of the 20th century. After his trial, however, he declared, "My triumph as a counterfeiter was my defeat as [a] creative artist."

== List of forgeries ==
=== Known forgeries ===
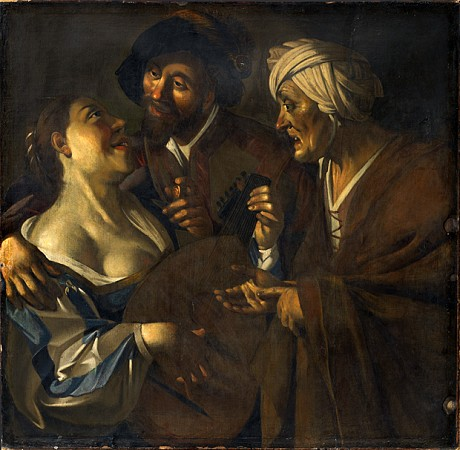
Han van Meegeren's forgery of The Procuress by Dirck van Baburen

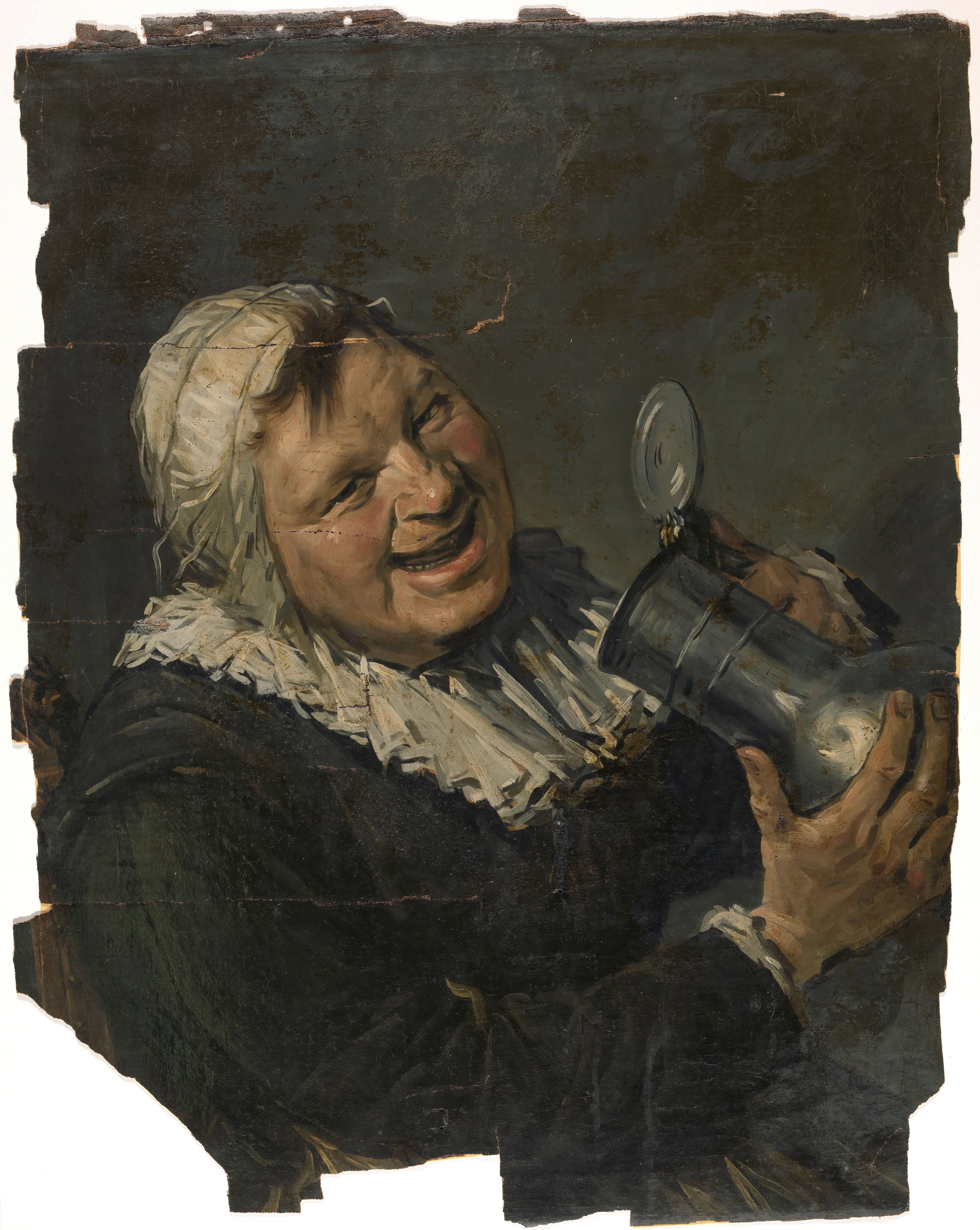
A painting by Han van Meegeren in imitation of Frans Hals' Malle Babbe

List of known forgeries by Han van Meegeren (unless specified differently, they are after Vermeer):

- A counterpart to Laughing Cavalier after Frans Hals (1923) once the subject of a scandal in The Hague in 1923, its present whereabouts is unknown.
- The Happy Smoker after Frans Hals (1923) hangs in the Groninger Museum in the Netherlands
- Man and Woman at a Spinet 1932 (perhaps without misleading intentions, sold to Amsterdam banker, Dr. Fritz Mannheimer)
- Lady reading a letter 1935–1936 (unsold, on display at the Rijksmuseum)
- Lady playing a lute and looking out the window 1935–1936 (unsold, on display at the Rijksmuseum)
- Portrait of a Man 1935–1936 in the style of Gerard ter Borch (unsold, on display at the Rijksmuseum)
- Woman Drinking after Frans Hals (version of Malle Babbe) 1935–1936 (unsold, on display at the Rijksmuseum.)
- The Supper at Emmaus, 1936–1937 (sold to the Boymans for 520,000–550,000 guldens, about US$300,000 or US$4 Million today)
- Interior with Drinkers 1937–1938 (sold to D G. van Beuningen for 219,000–220,000 guldens about US$120,000 or US$1.6 million today)
- The Last Supper I, 1938–1939
- Interior with Cardplayers 1938–1939 (sold to W. van der Vorm for 219,000–220,000 guldens US$120,000 or US$1.6 million today)
- The Head of Christ, 1940–1941 (sold to D G. van Beuningen for 400,000–475,000 guldens about US$225,000 or US$3.25 million today)
- The Last Supper II, 1940–1942 (sold to D G. van Beuningen for 1,600,000 guldens about US$600,000 or US$7 million today)
- The Blessing of Jacob 1941–1942 (sold to W. van der Vorm for 1,270,000 guldens about US$500,000 or US$5.75 million today)
- Christ with the Adulteress 1941–1942 (sold to Hermann Göring for 1,650,000 guldens about US$624,000 or US$6.75 million today, now in the public collection of Museum de Fundatie)
- The Washing of the Feet 1941–1943 (sold to the Netherlands state for 1,250,000–1,300,000 guldens about US$500,000 or US$5.3 million today, on display at the Rijksmuseum)
- Jesus among the Doctors September 1945 (painted during trial under Court's control, and sold at auction for 3,000 guldens, about US$800 or US$7,000 today)
- The Procuress given to the Courtauld Institute as a fake in 1960 and confirmed as such by chemical analysis in 2011.

Posthumously, Van Meegeren's forgeries have been shown in exhibitions around the world, including exhibitions in Amsterdam (1952), Basel (1953), Zürich (1953), Haarlem in the Kunsthandel de Boer (1958), London (1961), Rotterdam (1971), Minneapolis (1973), Essen (1976–1977), Berlin (1977), Slot Zeist (1985), New York (1987), Berkeley, California (1990), Munich (1991), Rotterdam (1996), The Hague (1996) and more recently at the Haagse Kunstkring, The Hague (2004) and Stockholm (2004), and have thus been made broadly accessible to the public.

=== Potential forgeries ===
It is possible that other fakes hang in art collections all over the world. Jacques van Meegeren suggested that his father had created a number of other forgeries, during interviews with journalists regarding discussions with his father. Some of these possible forgeries include:

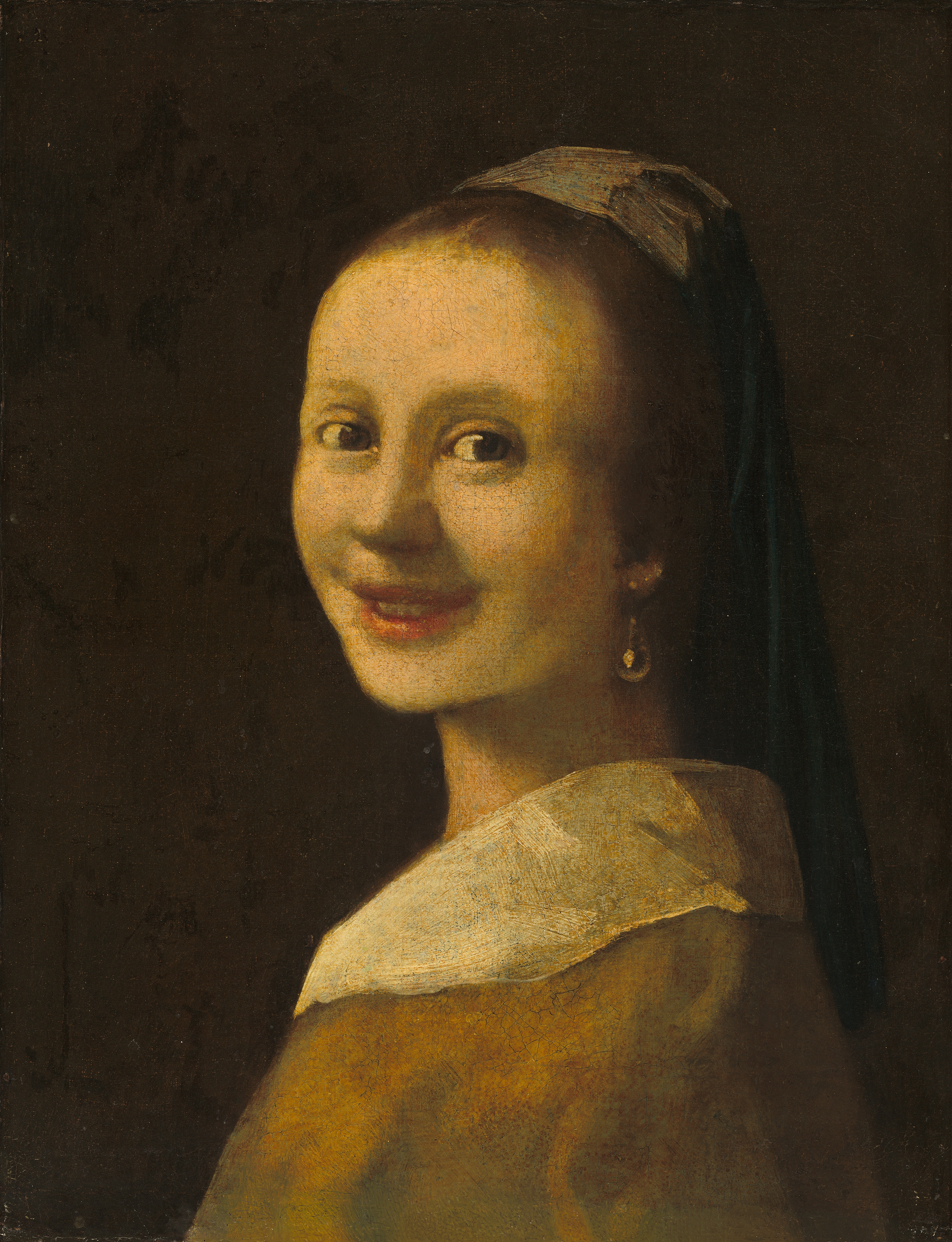
Smiling Girl may have been painted by Van Meegeren.

- Boy with a Little Dog and The Rommelpotspeler after Frans Hals. The Frans Hals catalogue by Frans L. M. Dony mentions four paintings by this name attributed to Frans Hals or the "school of Frans Hals".
- A counterpart to Vermeer's Girl with a Pearl Earring. A painting called Smiling Girl hangs in the National Gallery of Art in Washington, D.C. (bequest Andrew W. Mellon) which has been recognized by the museum as a fake. It was attributed to Theo van Wijngaarden, friend and partner of Van Meegeren, but may have been painted by Van Meegeren.
- The Lacemaker, c. 1925, owned by the National Gallery of Art in Washington, D.C. (bequest Andrew W. Mellon), which has been recognized by the museum as a fake. It may have been painted by Van Meegeren or Theo van Wijngaarde.
- Lady with a Blue Hat after Vermeer which was sold to Baron Heinrich Thyssen in 1930. Its present whereabouts are unknown. It is often referred to as the “Greta Garbo” Vermeer.
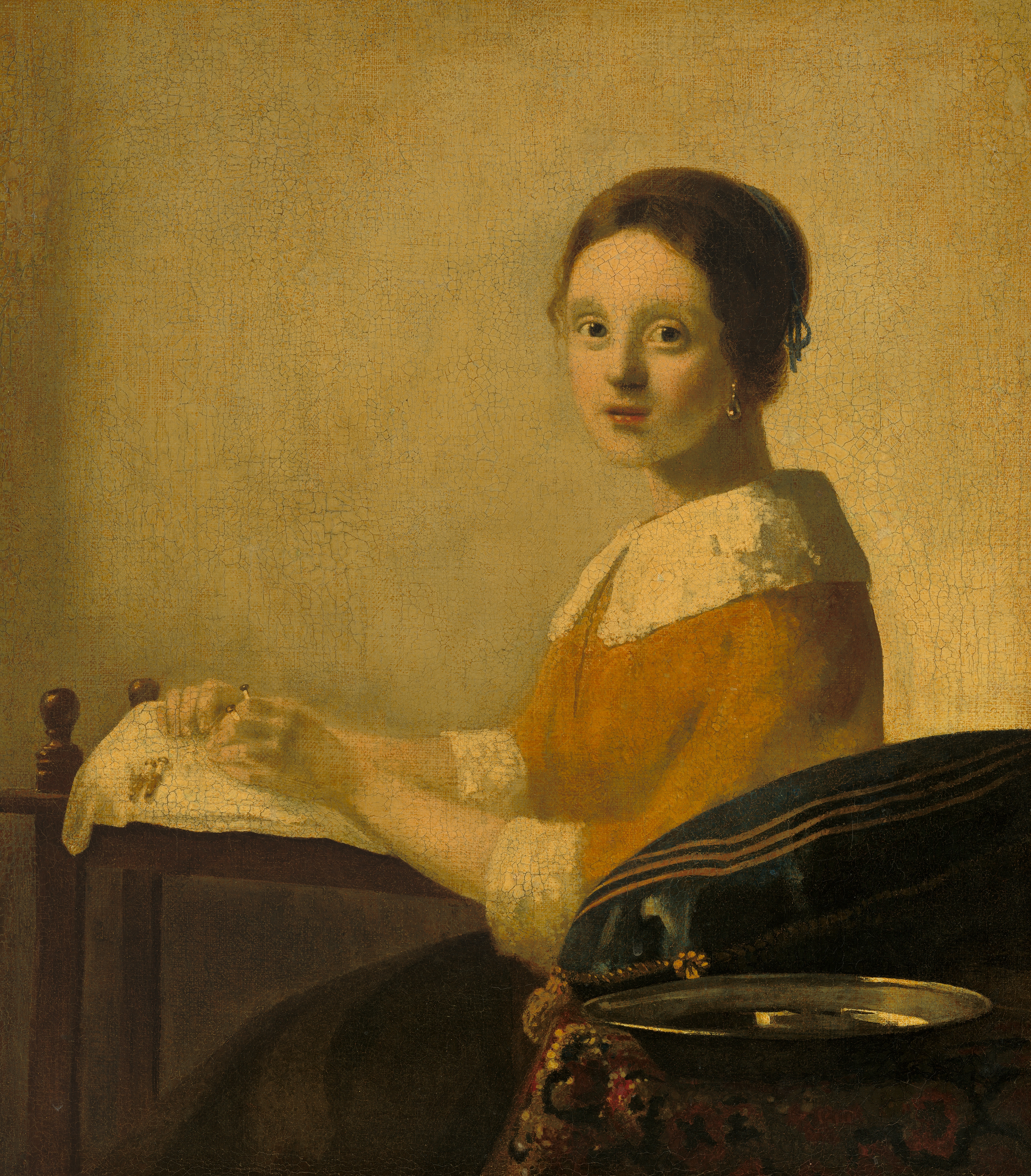
  The Lacemaker may have been painted by Van Meegeren.

== Original artwork ==
Van Meegeren was a prolific artist and produced thousands of original paintings in a number of diverse styles. This wide range in painting and drawing styles often irritated art critics. Some of his typical works are classical still lifes in convincing 17th-century manner, Impressionistic paintings of people frolicking on lakes or beaches, jocular drawings where the subject is drawn with rather odd features, and Surrealistic paintings with combined fore- and backgrounds. Van Meegeren's portraits, however, are probably his finest works.

Among his original works is his famous Deer, pictured above. Other works include his prize-winning St. Laurens Cathedral; a Portrait of the actress Jo Oerlemans (his second wife); his Night Club; from the Roaring Twenties; the cheerful watercolor A Summer Day on the Beach and many others.

=== The forger, forged ===
Van Meegeren's own work rose in price after he had become known as a forger, and it consequently became worthwhile to fake his paintings, as well. Existing paintings obtained a signature "H. van Meegeren", or new pictures were made in his style and falsely signed. When Van Meegeren saw a fake like that, he ironically remarked that he would have adopted them if they had been good enough, but regrettably he had not yet seen one.

Later, Han van Meegeren's son Jacques van Meegeren started to fake his father's work. He made paintings in his father's style – although of much lower quality – and was able to place a perfect signature on these imitations. Many fakes – both by Jacques and by others – are still on the market.

== In media ==
In 1961, Anton Walbrook played Han van Meegeren (renamed Han van Maasdijk) in the West End play Masterpiece. Written by Larry Ward and Gordon Russell, it was performed at London's Royalty Theatre from 26 January to 25 February.

In 2016 Van Meegeren was played by Jeroen Spitzenberger in the Dutch film A Real Vermeer. In 2019 he was played by Guy Pearce in the movie The Last Vermeer, which tells the story of the investigation into his sale of the painting "Jesus and the Adulteress" to Nazi officer Hermann Göring. The movie was based on the book The Man Who Made Vermeers, Unvarnishing the Legend of Master Forger Han Van Meegeren, by Jonathan Lopez.

In 2025 Van Meegeren was portrayed in the Chinese musical "Savior", which explored themes of art, authenticity and faith in the aftermath of war through the dramatic trial of Van Meegeren. The musical premiered in Shanghai on 8 July 2025.
