= Theo van Wijngaarden =

Dutch painter (1874–1952)

Theo van Wijngaarden (27 February 1874, Rotterdam – 4 November 1952, Voorburg) was a Dutch art forger and restorer, best known for his involvement in the creation and distribution of forged paintings in collaboration with Han van Meegeren, another notorious art forger.

== Early life and career ==
Van Wijngaarden was born in Rotterdam and later lived in The Hague. Trained as an artist and restorer, he found his primary source of income in the art restoration field. Van Wijngaarden was skilled in restoring and altering paintings, a talent that allowed him to manipulate and modify artworks in ways that would later serve his involvement in forgery.

=== Collaboration with Han van Meegeren ===
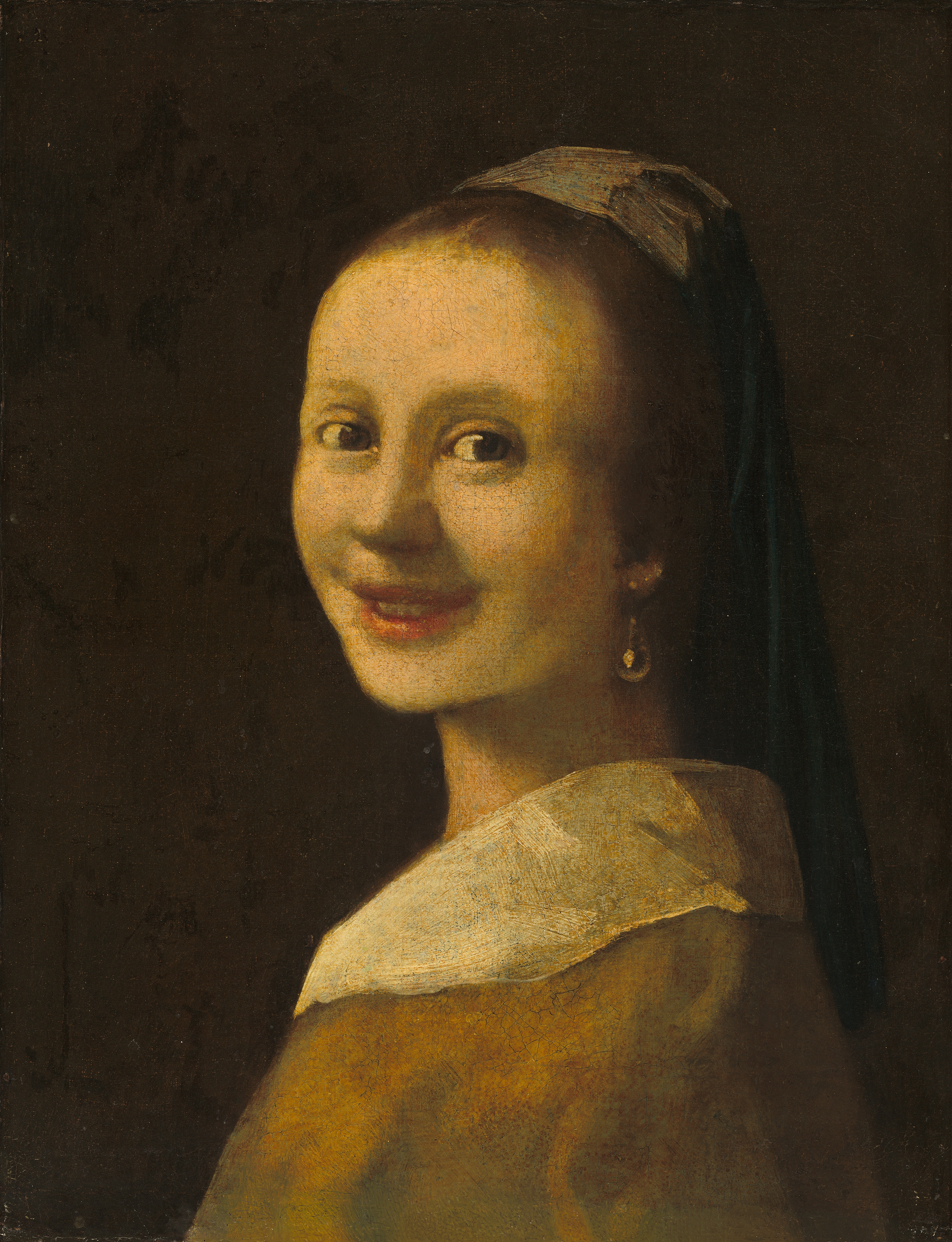
The Smiling Girl

Associated often with fellow art forger Han van Meegeren, Van Wijngaarden was a lesser artist whose legitimate income came largely from restoration, working with cheaply purchased pictures and moving them to other areas of Europe to sell for a profit. He worked on several of van Meegeren's forgeries, including Frans Hals and Smiling Girl, a painting once thought to be a work of Dutch painter Johannes Vermeer, akin to his Girl with a Pearl Earring and donated by collector Andrew W. Mellon to the National Gallery of Art in Washington, D.C. in 1937. Van Wijngaarden often served as the front man, making the sales deals on van Meegeren's forgeries.

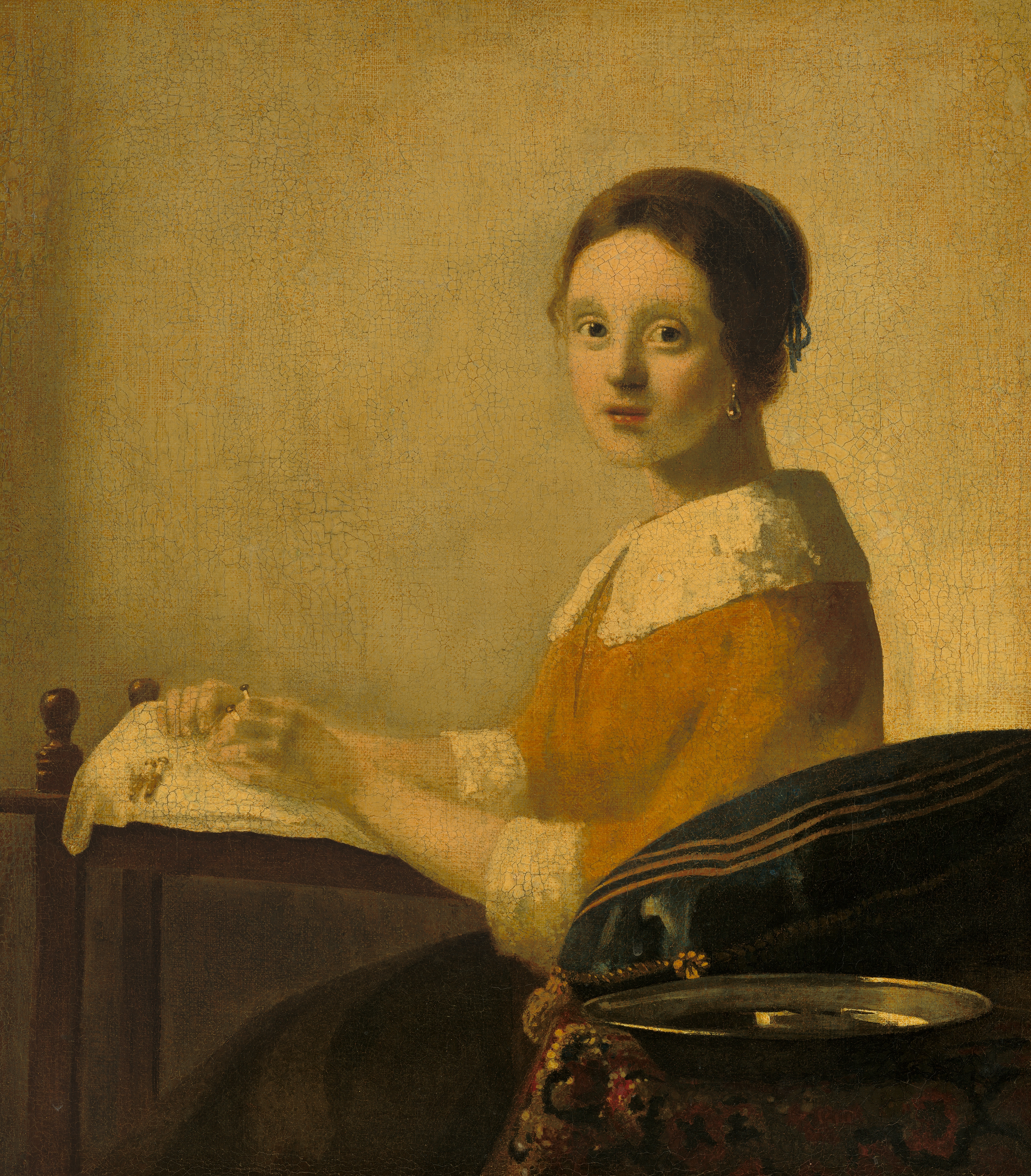
The Lacemaker, another forgery.

== Literature ==
- Jonathan Lopez: The Man Who Made Vermeers. Unvarnishing the Legend of Master Forger Han van Meegeren. Orlando, Harcourt Inc., 2008. ISBN 9780151013418
