= 1663 in art =

Events from the year 1663 in art.

== Events ==
- Claude Lorrain completes his last etching, The Goatherd.

== Paintings ==
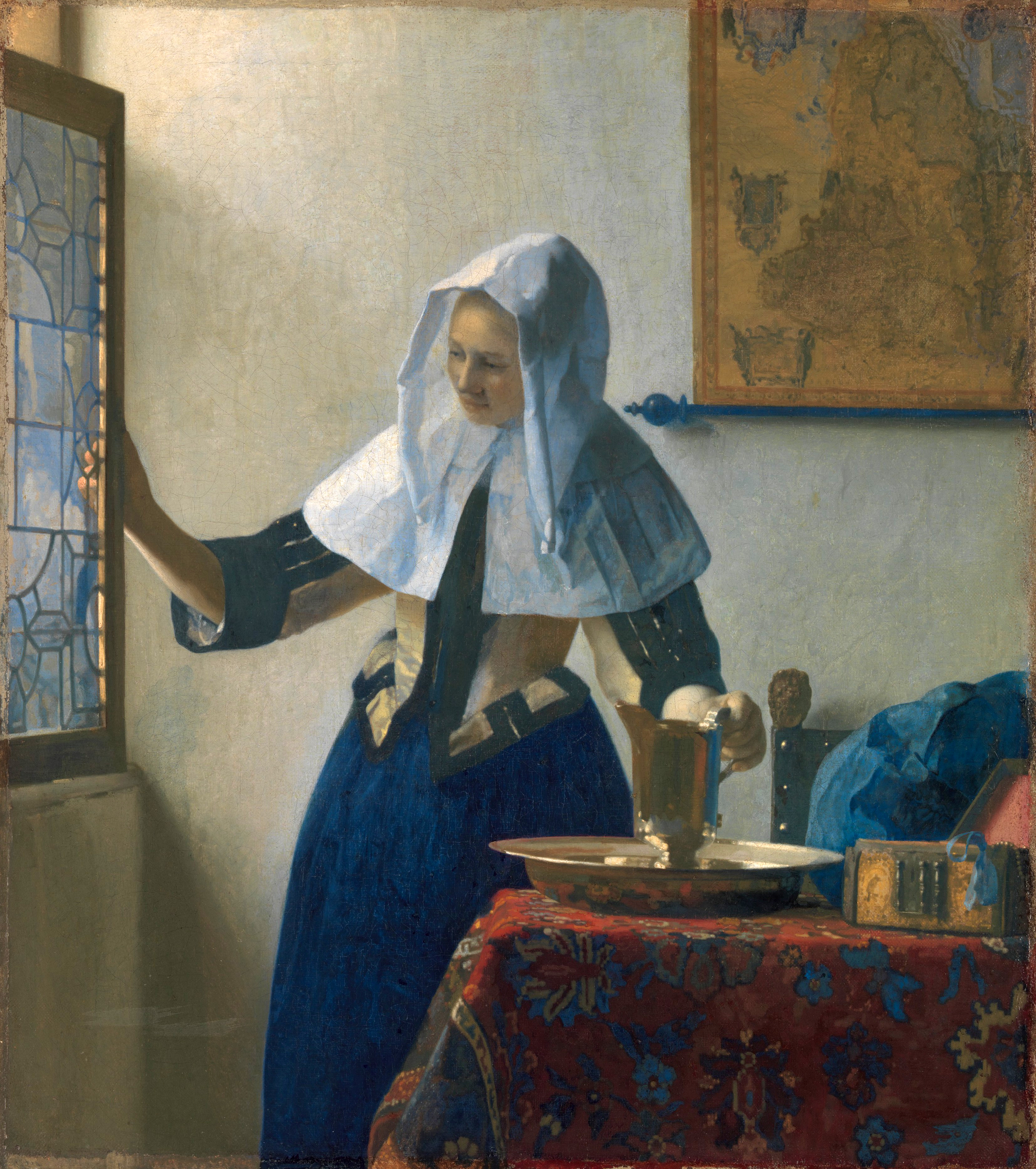
Vermeer – Woman with a Water Jug

- Gerrit Dou – The Dropsical Woman
- Pieter de Hooch
  - A Game of Nine Pins (approximate date of first version, Waddesdon Manor, England)
  - A Woman Peeling Apples
- Elisabetta Sirani – Virgin and Child
- Jan Vermeer
  - Woman Holding a Balance
  - Woman Reading a Letter
  - Young Woman with a Water Jug (Metropolitan Museum of Art, New York)

== Births ==
- January 20 - Luca Carlevarijs or Carlevaris, Italian painter of landscapes (died 1730)
- date unknown
  - Michelangelo Cerruti, Italian fresco artist (died 1749)
  - Gennaro Greco, Italian painter, also known as "Il Mascacotta", veduta painter (died 1714)
  - Amalia Wilhelmina Königsmarck, Swedish painter (died 1740)
  - Louis Laguerre, French decorative painter working in England (died 1721)
  - Nicola Malinconico, Neapolitan painter (died 1721)
  - Pierre Drevet, French portrait engraver (died 1738)
  - Ogata Kenzan, Japanese potter and painter (died 1743)
  - Giovanni Odazzi, Italian painter and etcher (died 1731)
  - Giacomo Parolini, Italian painter of altarpieces (died 1733)
  - Robert van Audenaerde, Flemish painter and engraver (died 1748)
  - Sieuwert van der Meulen, Dutch painter (died 1730)
- probable - Pietro da Pietri, Italian painter of an altarpiece for Santa Maria in Via Lata (died 1708, 1716, or 1721)

== Deaths ==
- July – Lubin Baugin, French painter (born 1610)
- July 21 - Hendrickje Stoffels, model and mistress of Rembrandt (born 1626)
- date unknown
  - Guido Cagnacci, Italian painter of the Bolognese School (born 1601)
  - Michel Dorigny, French painter and engraver (born 1617)
  - Balthazar Gerbier, Dutch art advisor and designer at the English court (born 1592)
  - Domenico Manetti, Italian painter (born 1609)
  - Jan Miel, Flemish painter (born 1599)
  - Francesco Allegrini da Gubbio, Italian painter of the Baroque period (born 1587)
  - Hendrick van Balen the Younger, Flemish painter (born 1621)
- probable
  - Michiel II Coignet, Flemish painter who specialized in small paintings for cabinets (born 1618)
  - Chiara Varotari, Italian painter (born 1584)
