= Girl Interrupted at Her Music =

1660–1661 painting by Johannes Vermeer

Girl Interrupted at her Music
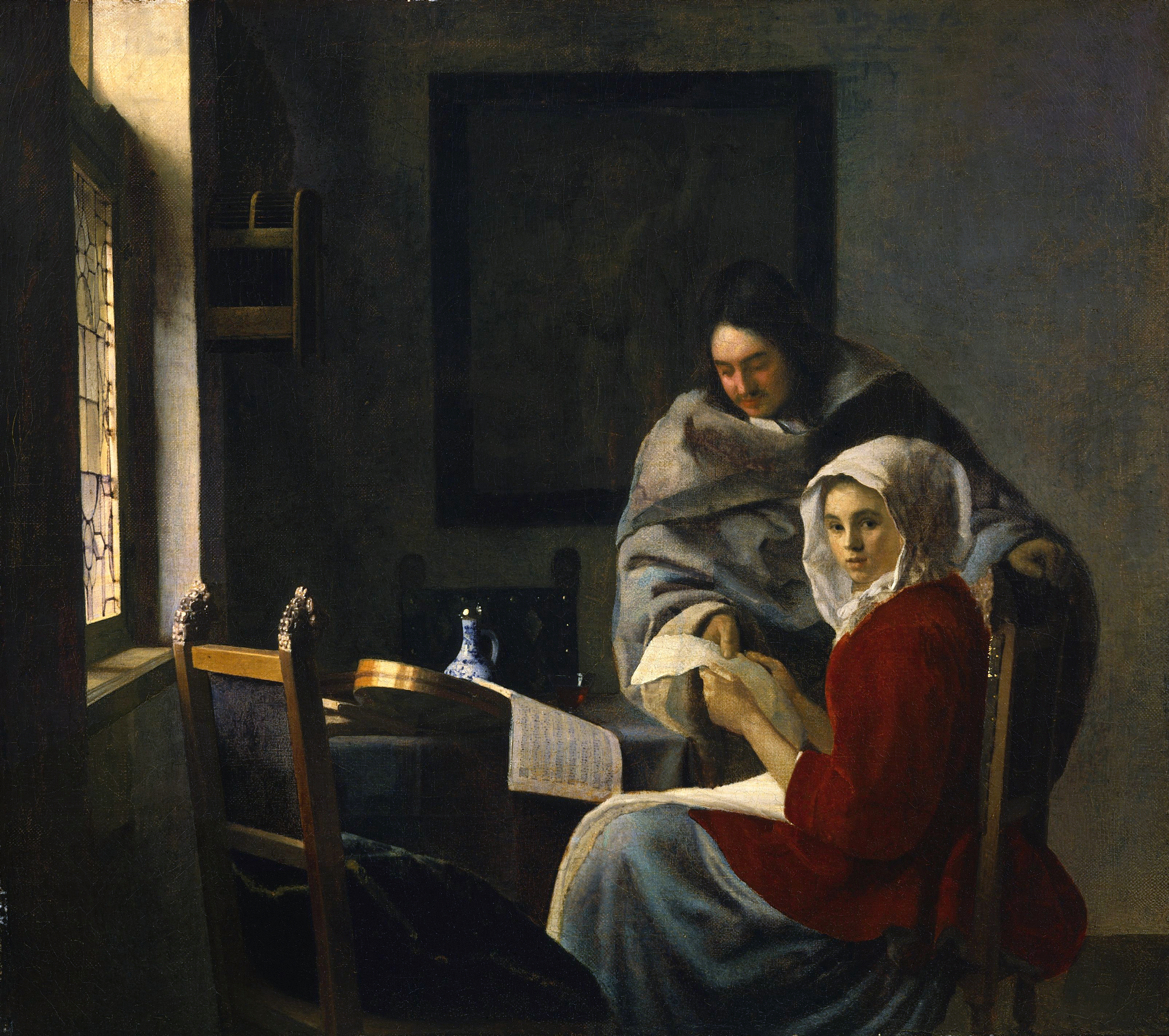
- Artist: Johannes Vermeer
- Year: c. 1658–1659
- Medium: Oil on canvas
- Dimensions: 39.4 cm × 44.5 cm (15.5 in × 17.5 in)
- Location: Frick Collection, New York

Girl Interrupted at Her Music (Dutch: Onderbreking van de muziek) is a painting by the Dutch artist Johannes Vermeer. It was painted in the baroque style, probably between the years 1658 and 1659, using oil on canvas. Since 1901 it has been in the Frick Collection in New York City.

In this painting, Vermeer depicts a woman at her music with a gentleman beside her. It shows typical 17th century courtship in Europe. It highlights the importance that music often played to love during this time.

The room that they are shown in is one of higher class, most likely belonging to a person of the haute bourgeoisie. The painting is very reminiscent of Vermeer’s other works.

== Important objects and symbols ==
=== Wine glass ===
The wine glass, discreetly shown on the table behind the songbook, is tied with both joyfulness and seduction. In the 17th century it was popular to paint scenes that depicted feasts that included drinking, gaming, and playing music. Later on, these large gatherings became smaller and more exclusive with two or three people shown. Drinking wine was also associated with love during this time period. The glass appears full and untouched, which symbolizes the slow moving relationship between the man and the woman.

=== Window ===
On the left side of the painting is a multi-paned window, from which the light source is provided for the scene. Vermeer used the same window design in nine of his other works (The Music Lesson, The Girl with the Wine Glass, The Glass of Wine, Officer and Laughing Girl, Lady Writing a Letter with her Maid, Woman with a Water Jug, Woman with a Lute, Woman Holding a Balance, and Woman with a Pearl Necklace). Some experts questioned whether this painting was by Vermeer. The precision of the lighting from the window was thought to prove that it was in fact an original Vermeer.

=== Chairs ===
The chairs depicted in the painting are thought to have been from Spain. They are some of the few objects in the painting that were not damaged by heavy restoration. You can see the minute details including the lion head carving, the brass studs, and the “lozenge” pattern that were all popular aspects of furniture during the time.

=== Painting ===
The hazy painting in the background of the scene is of Cupid. The painting within a painting was discovered after its restoration in 1907; it had been covered up by a wall and a hanging violin. Several observations have been made about the Cupid painting and what it could have to do with the overall painting, including that Cupid may be warning the couple about the dangers of love, that Cupid's upraised hand was a symbol that you must only have one lover, that Cupid is holding up a blank card which represents love as a game, or shows that "love is in the air". The reason for Vermeer including the miniature Cupid painting may never be revealed due to the painting's damaged condition.

=== Vase ===
On the table sits a vase made of porcelain and silver, likely used for serving wine. One of the main centers for porcelain in the Netherlands was and still is Delft, although they had "limited success" in recreating Chinese porcelain.

=== Man ===
The man in the painting is likely upper class, due to his fashionable attire.

=== Music ===
Love and music often went hand in hand in the 17th century, especially with the presence of a musical duet between a man and a woman. Playing music with one another was one of the few activities where young people of the opposite sex could socialize. The two in the painting were likely part of the haute bourgeoisie, which meant that they were worldly and educated when it came to music, and each likely had a personal collection of songbooks.

== Cultural references ==
The painting is a theme in the book Girl, Interrupted by Susanna Kaysen, the title of that book being based on the title of the painting.

In her song At the Frick Museum from the album Queens of the Summer Hotel, singer-songwriter Aimee Mann references Vermeer’s Girl Interrupted at Her Music. The lyrics describe the narrator encountering a Vermeer painting featuring "a girl, a startled glance, and something in the circumstance," evoking the introspective and enigmatic qualities often associated with Vermeer’s works.

== See also ==
- List of paintings by Johannes Vermeer
- Dutch Golden Age painting
