= Woman Reading a Letter (Vermeer) =

Painting by Johannes Vermeer c. 1663

- Brieflezende vrouw (Dutch)
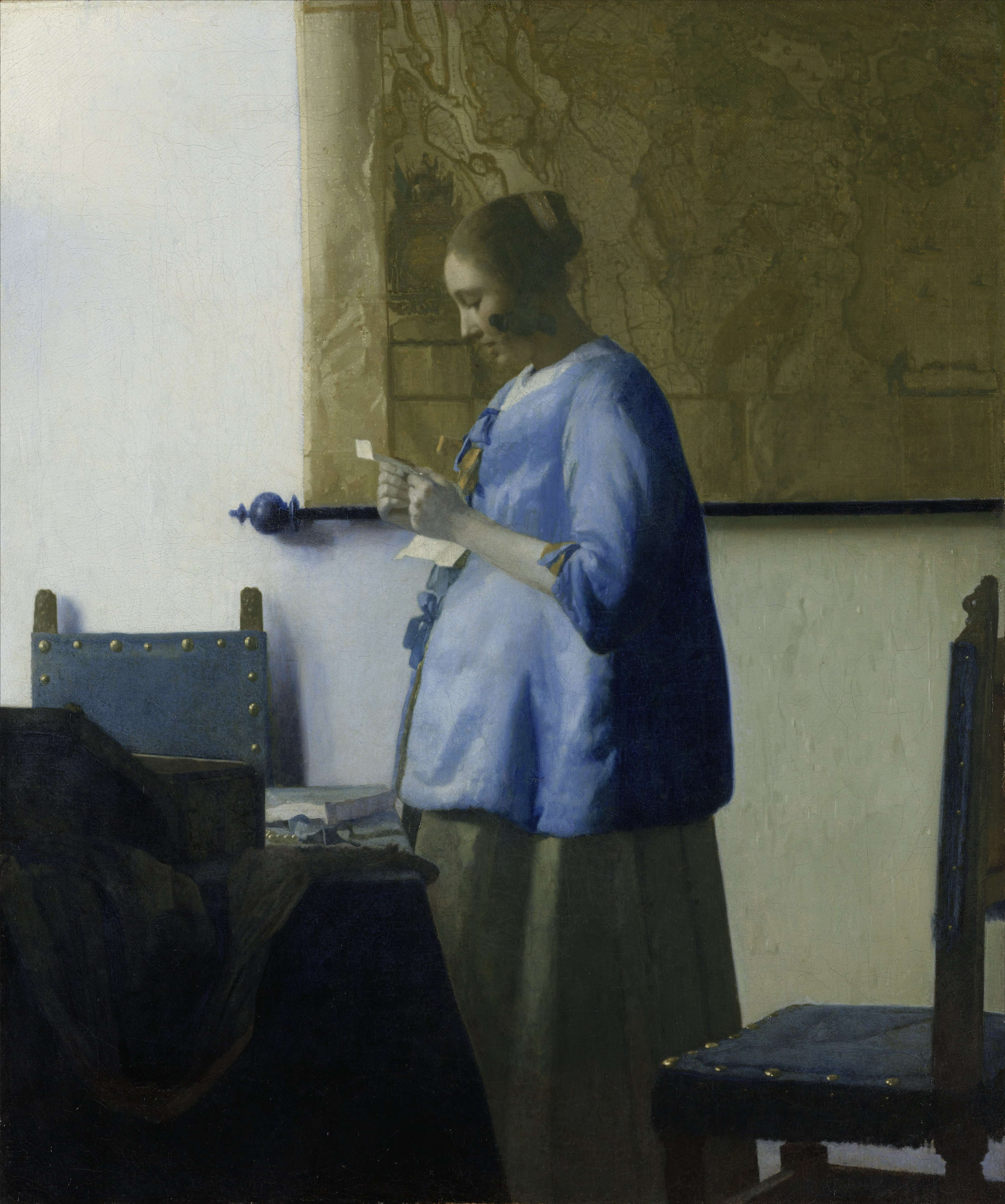
- Artist: Johannes Vermeer
- Year: c. 1663
- Medium: Oil on canvas
- Movement: Dutch Golden Age painting
- Dimensions: 46.6 cm × 39.1 cm (18.3 in × 15.4 in)
- Location: Rijksmuseum Amsterdam, Amsterdam

Woman Reading a Letter (Dutch: Brieflezende vrouw) is a painting by the Dutch Golden Age painter Johannes Vermeer, produced around 1663. It has been part of the collection of the City of Amsterdam since the Van der Hoop bequest in 1854, and in the Rijksmuseum in Amsterdam since it opened in 1885, the first Vermeer it acquired.

== Composition ==
The central element of the painting is a woman in blue standing in front of a window (not depicted) reading a letter. The woman appears to be pregnant, although many have argued that the woman's rounded figure is simply a result of the fashions of the day. Although the woman's loose clothing may be suggestive, pregnancy was very rarely depicted in art during this period.

While the contents of the letter are not visible, the composition of the painting is revealing. The map of the County of Holland and West Friesland in the Netherlands on the wall behind the woman has been interpreted as suggesting that the letter she reads was written by a traveling husband. Alternatively, the box of pearls barely visible on the table before the woman might suggest a lover as pearls are sometimes a symbol of vanity. The very action of letter-reading reflects a thematic pattern throughout Vermeer's works, as a common private moment becomes revealing of the human condition.

The painting is unique among Vermeer's interiors in that no fragment of corner, floor or ceiling can be seen.

The composition and the female figure are similar to Vermeer's 1657-59 painting Girl Reading a Letter at an Open Window. This work has similarities to his similarly-dated Woman with a Pearl Necklace and Woman Holding a Balance. The map, drawn by Balthasar Florisz. van Berckenrode, was published in 1620 and reprinted by Willem Blaeu in 1621; It also appears in Vermeer's Officer and Laughing Girl. The latter however, shows a polychromatic map while Woman Reading a Letter depicts a monochromatic print. That such a map really existed is proven by a monochromatic exemplar preserved in the collection of the Westfries Museum at Hoorn.

== See also ==
- Dutch Golden Age painting
- List of paintings by Johannes Vermeer
- The Woman in Blue (Ruth Galloway #8), a novel by Ellie Griffiths
