= The Milkmaid (Vermeer) =

1658–1661 painting by Johannes Vermeer

- Artist: Johannes Vermeer
- Year: c. 1657–1658 (though estimates differ)
- Medium: Oil on canvas
- Movement: Baroque, Dutch Golden Age
- Dimensions: H 45.5 cm × W 41 cm (17 7/8 in × 16 1/8 in)
- Location: Rijksmuseum, Amsterdam

The Milkmaid (Dutch: De melkmeid or Het melkmeisje), sometimes called The Kitchen Maid (Dutch: De keukenmeid), is an oil-on-canvas painting of a "milkmaid", in fact, a domestic kitchen maid, by the Dutch artist Johannes Vermeer. It is in the Rijksmuseum in Amsterdam, the Netherlands, which regards it as "unquestionably one of the museum's finest attractions".

The exact year of the painting's completion is unknown, with estimates varying by source. The Rijksmuseum estimates it as circa 1658. According to the Metropolitan Museum of Art in New York City, it was painted in about 1657 or 1658. The "Essential Vermeer" website gives a broader range of 1658–1661.

== Descriptions and commentary ==
The painting shows a milkmaid, a woman who milks cows and makes dairy products like butter and cheese, in a plain room carefully pouring milk into a squat earthenware container on a table. Milkmaids began working solely in the stables before large houses hired them to do housework as well rather than hiring out for more staff. Also on the table in front of the milkmaid are various types of bread. She is a young, sturdily built woman wearing a crisp linen cap, a blue apron and work sleeves pushed up from thick forearms. A foot warmer is on the floor behind her, near Delft wall tiles depicting Cupid (to the viewer's left) and a figure with a pole (to the right). Intense light streams from the window on the left side of the canvas.

The painting is strikingly illusionistic, conveying not just details but a sense of the weight of the woman and the table. "The light, though bright, doesn't wash out the rough texture of the bread crusts or flatten the volumes of the maid's thick waist and rounded shoulders", wrote Karen Rosenberg, an art critic for The New York Times. Yet with half of the woman's face in shadow, it is "impossible to tell whether her downcast eyes and pursed lips express wistfulness or concentration," she wrote.

"It's a little bit of a Mona Lisa effect" in modern viewers' reactions to the painting, according to Walter Liedtke, curator of the department of European paintings at the Metropolitan Museum of Art, and organizer of two Vermeer exhibits. "There's a bit of mystery about her for modern audiences. She is going about her daily task, faintly smiling. And our reaction is 'What is she thinking?'"

=== Dutch iconography of maids ===
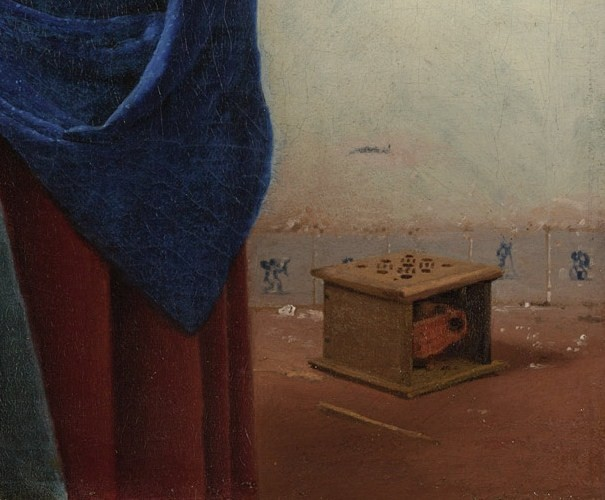
Painting detail showing the foot warmer, with tiles of Cupid and a man with a pole on either side of it; the clothes basket Vermeer removed from the painting was here. Also shown is a detail from the maid's brilliant blue apron.

The woman would have been known as a "kitchen maid" or maid-of-all-work rather than a specialised "milkmaid" at the time the painting was created: "milk maids" were women who milked cows; kitchen maids worked in kitchens. For at least two centuries before the painting was created, milkmaids and kitchen maids had a reputation as being predisposed to love or sex, and this was frequently reflected in Dutch paintings of kitchen and market scenes from Antwerp, Utrecht and Delft. Some of the paintings were slyly suggestive, like The Milkmaid, others more coarsely so.

The leading artists in this tradition were the Antwerp painters Joachim Beuckelaer (c. 1535–1575) and Frans Snyders (1579–1657), who had many followers and imitators, as well as Pieter Aertsen (who, like Beukelaer, had clients in Delft), the Utrecht Mannerist painter Joachim Wtewael (1566–1638), and his son, Peter Wtewael (1596–1660). Closer to Vermeer's day, Nicolaes Maes painted several comic pictures now given titles such as The Lazy Servant. However by this time there was an alternative convention of painting women at work in the home as exemplars of Dutch domestic virtue, dealt with at length by Simon Schama.

In Dutch literature and paintings of Vermeer's time, maids were often depicted as subjects of male desire—dangerous women threatening the honor and security of the home, the center of Dutch life—although some Vermeer contemporaries, such as Pieter de Hooch, had started to represent them in a more neutral way, as did Michael Sweerts. Vermeer's painting is one of the rare examples of a maid treated in an empathetic and dignified way, although amorous symbols in this work still exemplify the tradition.

Other painters in this tradition, such as Gerrit Dou (1613–1675), depicted attractive maids with symbolic objects such as jugs and various forms of game and produce. "In almost all the works of this tradition there is an erotic element, which is conveyed through gestures ranging from jamming chickens onto spits to gently offering — or so the direction of view suggests — an intimate glimpse of some vaguely uterine object," according to Liedtke. In Dou's 1646 painting, Girl Chopping Onions (now in the British Royal Collection), a pewter tankard may refer to both male and female anatomy, and the picture contains other contemporary symbols of lust, such as onions (said to have aphrodisiacal properties), and a dangling bird. Milk also had lewd connotations, from the slang term melken, defined as "to sexually attract or lure" (a meaning that may have originated from watching farm girls working under cows, according to Liedtke). Examples of works using milk this way include Lucas van Leyden's engraving The Milkmaid (1510) and Jacques de Gheyn II's engraving The Archer and the Milkmaid (about 1610).

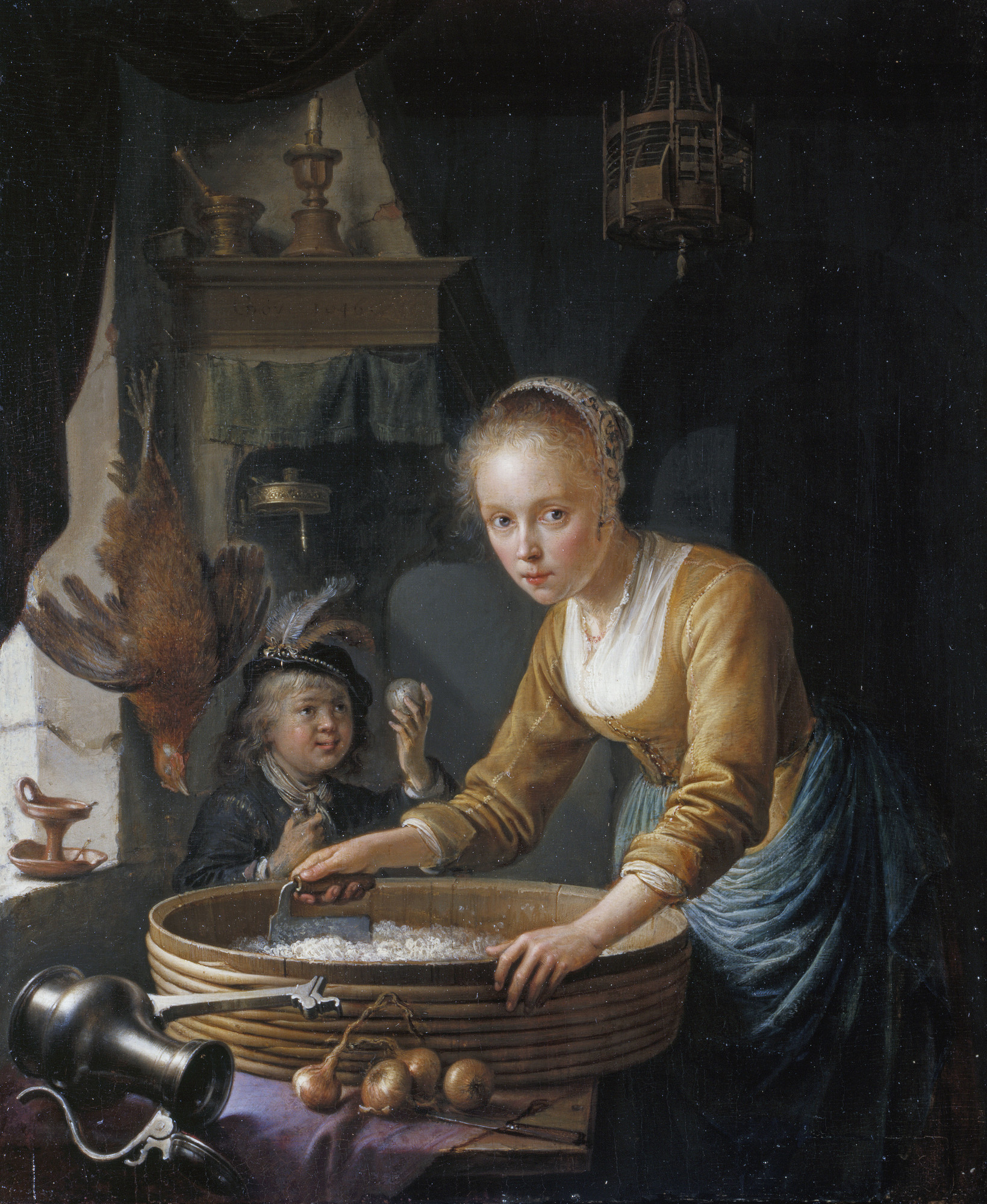
Gerrit Dou, Girl Chopping Onions

Vermeer's painting is even more understated, although the use of symbols remains: one of the Delft tiles at the foot of the wall behind the maid, near the foot warmer, depicts Cupid – which can imply arousal of a woman or simply that while she is working she is daydreaming about a man. Other amorous symbols in the painting include a wide-mouthed jug, often used as a symbol of the female anatomy. The foot warmer was often used by artists as a symbol for female sexual arousal because, when placed under a skirt, it heats the whole body below the waist, according to Liedtke. The coals enclosed inside the foot warmer could symbolize "either the heat of lust in tavern or brothel scenes, or the hidden but true burning passion of a woman for her husband", according to Serena Cant, a British art historian and lecturer. Yet the whitewashed wall and presence of milk seem to indicate that the room was a "cool kitchen" used for cooking with dairy products, such as milk and butter, so the foot warmer would have a pragmatic purpose there. Since other Dutch paintings of the period indicate that foot warmers were used when seated, its presence in the picture may symbolize the standing woman's "hardworking nature", according to Cant.

The painting is part of a social context of the sexual or romantic interactions of maids and men of higher social ranks that has now disappeared in Europe and which was never commonly recognized in America. Liedtke offers as an example Vermeer's contemporary, Samuel Pepys, whose diary records encounters with kitchen maids, oyster girls, and, at an inn during a 1660 visit to Delft, "an exceedingly pretty lass ... right for the sport". The painting was first owned by (and may have been painted for) Pieter van Ruijven, owner of several other paintings by Vermeer which also depicted attractive young women and with themes of desire and self-denial quite different from the attitude of Pepys and many of the paintings in the Dutch "kitchenmaid" tradition.

In Dutch, Het Melkmeisje is the painting's most-used name. Although this title is less accurate in modern Dutch, the word "meid" (maid) has gained a negative connotation that is not present in its diminutive form ("meisje")—hence the use of the more friendly title for the work, used by the Rijksmuseum and others.

=== Narrative and thematic elements ===
According to art historian Harry Rand, the painting suggests the woman is making bread pudding, which would account for the milk and the broken pieces of bread on the table. Rand assumed she would have already made custard in which the bread mixed with egg would be soaking at the moment depicted in the painting. She pours milk into the Dutch oven to cover the mixture because otherwise the bread, if not simmering in liquid while it is baking, will become an unappetizing, dry crust instead of forming the typical upper surface of the pudding. She is careful in pouring the trickle of milk because bread pudding can be ruined when the ingredients are not accurately measured or properly combined.

By depicting the working maid in the act of careful cooking, the artist presents not just a picture of an everyday scene, but one with ethical and social value. The humble woman is using common ingredients and otherwise useless stale bread to create a pleasurable product for the household. "Her measured demeanor, modest dress and judiciousness in preparing her food conveys eloquently yet unobtrusively one of the strongest values of 17th-century Netherlands, domestic virtue", according to the Essential Vermeer website.

"In the end, it is not the allusions to female sexuality that give this painting its romance or emotional resonance — it is the depiction of honest, hard work as something romantic in and of itself," Raquel Laneri wrote in Forbes magazine. "The Milkmaid elevates the drudgery of housework and servitude to virtuous, even heroic, levels."

=== Compositional strategy ===
An impression of monumentality and "perhaps a sense of dignity" is lent to the image by the artist's choice of a relatively low vantage point and a pyramidal building up of forms from the left foreground to the woman's head, according to a web page of The Metropolitan Museum of Art. According to the Rijksmuseum, the painting "is built up along two diagonal lines. They meet by the woman's right wrist." This focuses the attention of the viewer on the pouring of the milk.

The photograph-like realism of the painting resembles that of Leiden artists such as Dou, Frans van Mieris, and Gabriël Metsu. Vermeer, who was age twenty-five when he painted this work, was "shopping around in Dutch art for different styles and subjects", according to Liedtke. "He's looking, in this case, mainly at artists like Gerrit Dou and others who work in a meticulous, illusionistic way." Liedtke sees the work as either Vermeer's "last early work or first mature work". The curator added, "I almost think he had to explore what you might call 'tactile illusionism' to understand where he really wanted to go, which was in the more optical, light-filled direction."

Characteristic of Delft artistry and of Vermeer's work, the painting also has a "classic balance" of figurative elements and an "extraordinary treatment of light", according to The Metropolitan Museum of Art. The wall on the left, according to Liedtke, "gets you very quickly in the picture—that recession from the left and then the openness to the right—and this sort of left-corner scheme was used for about 10 years before Vermeer, and he was very quick to pick up the latest thing."

"Nowhere else in his oeuvre does one find such a sculptural figure and such seemingly tangible objects, and yet the future painter of luminous interiors has already arrived," according to the museum. The "pointillé pattern of bright dots on the bread and basket" are the "most effusive" use of that scheme in any Vermeer painting, and it appears to be used to suggest "scintillating daylight and rough textures at the same time."

Vermeer painted over two items originally in the painting. One was a large wall map (a Rijksmuseum web page calls it a painting) behind the upper part of the woman's body. (A wall map may not have been very out of place in a humble workroom such as the cold kitchen where the maid toiled: large maps in 17th-century Holland were inexpensive ways of decorating bare walls.) He originally placed a large, conspicuous clothes basket (the Rijksmuseum web page calls it a "sewing basket") near the bottom of the painting, behind the maid's red skirt, but then the artist painted it over, producing the slight shift in tone (pentimento) on the wall behind the foot warmer. The basket was later discovered with an X-ray. Other Vermeer paintings also have images removed. Some art critics have thought the removals may have been intended to provide the works with better thematic focus.

"[I]ts rustic immediacy differs from Vermeer's later paintings," according to Laneri. "There is a tactile, visceral quality to The Milkmaid — you can almost taste the thick, creamy milk escaping the jug, feel the cool dampness of the room and the starchy linen of the maid's white cap, touch her sculptural shoulders and corseted waist. She is not an apparition or abstraction. She is not the ideal, worldly housewife of Vermeer's later Young Woman with a Water Pitcher or the ethereal beauty in Girl with a Pearl Earring. She is not the cartoonish buxom vixen in Leyden's drawing. She is real — as real as a painting can get anyway."

=== Technique and materials ===
This painting has "perhaps, the most brilliant color scheme of his oeuvre", according to the Essential Vermeer website. Already in the 18th century, English painter and critic Joshua Reynolds praised the work for its striking quality. One of the distinctions of Vermeer's palette, compared with his contemporaries, was his preference for the expensive natural ultramarine (made from crushed lapis lazuli) where other painters typically used the much cheaper azurite. Along with the ultramarine, lead-tin-yellow is also a dominant color in an exceptionally luminous work (with a much less somber and conventional rendering of light than any of Vermeer's previous extant works). Depicting white walls was a challenge for artists in Vermeer's time, with his contemporaries using various forms of gray pigment. Here the white walls reflect the daylight with different intensities, displaying the effects of uneven textures on the plastered surfaces. The artist here used white lead, umber and charcoal black. Although the formula was widely known among Vermeer's contemporary genre painters, "perhaps no artist more than Vermeer was able to use it so effectively", according to the Essential Vermeer website.

The woman's coarse features are painted with thick dabs of impasto. The seeds on the crust of the bread, as well as the crust itself, along with the plaited handles of the bread basket, are rendered with pointillé dots. Soft parts of the bread are rendered with thin swirls of paint, with dabs of ochre used to show the rough edges of broken crust. One piece of bread to the viewer's right and close to the Dutch oven, has a broad band of yellow, different from the crust, which Cant believes is a suggestion that the piece is going stale. The small roll at the far right has thick impastoed dots that resemble a knobbly crust or a crust with seeds on it. The bread and basket, despite being closer to the viewer, are painted in a more diffuse way than the illusionistic realism of the wall, with its stains, shadowing, nail and nail hole, or the seams and fastenings of the woman's dress, the gleaming, polished brass container hanging from the wall. The panes of glass in the window are varied in a very realistic way, with a crack in one (fourth row from the bottom, far right) reflected on the wood of the window frame. Just below that pane, another has a scratch, indicated with a thin white line. Another pane (second row from the bottom, second from right) is pushed inward within its frame.

The discrepancy between objects at various distances from the viewer may indicate Vermeer used a camera obscura, according to Cant. Liedtke points out that a pinhole discovered in the canvas "has really punctured the theory of the camera obscura [...] The idea that Vermeer traced compositions in an optical device [...] is rather naive when you consider that the light lasts maybe 10 seconds, but the painting took at least months to paint." Instead, The pin in the canvas would have been tied to a string with chalk on it, which the painter would have snapped to get perspective lines, Liedtke said in a 2009 interview.

The woman's bulky green oversleeves were painted with the same yellow and blue paint used in the rest of the woman's clothing, worked at the same time in a wet-on-wet method. Broad strokes in the painting of the clothing suggests the coarse, thick texture of the work clothing. The blue cuff uses a lighter mixture of ultramarine and lead-white, together with a layer of ochre painted beneath it. The brilliant blue of the skirt or apron has been intensified with a glaze (a thin, transparent top layer) of the same color. The glazing helps suggest that the blue material is a less coarse fabric than the yellow bodice, according to Cant.

== Provenance ==
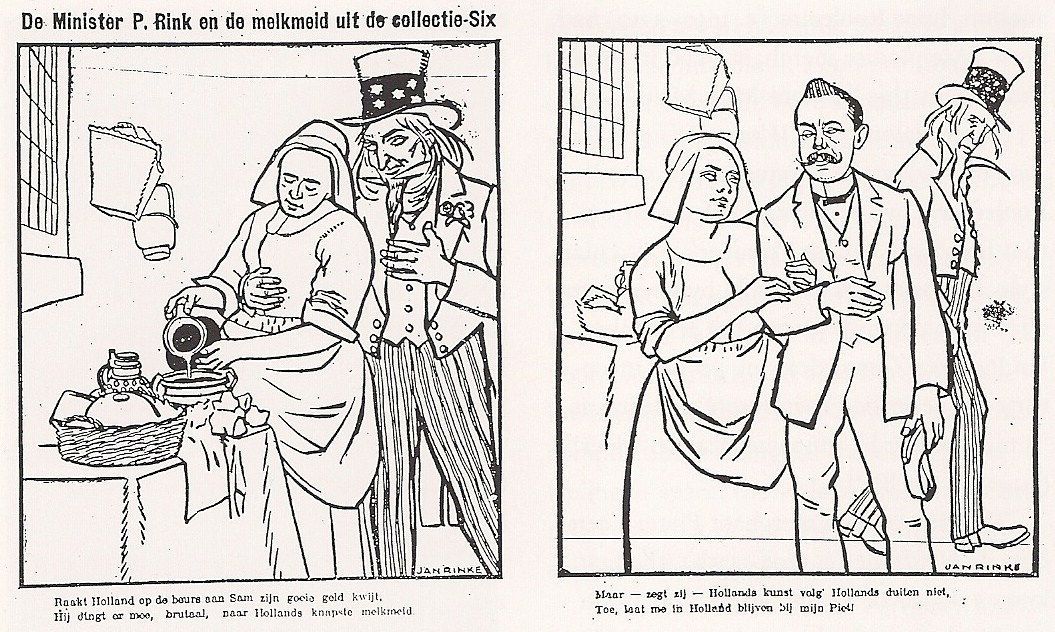
A 1907 Dutch cartoon by Jan Rinke, reflecting a controversy over whether the state should purchase the painting rather than let it possibly fall into the hands of some rich American art collector. The government bought the work for the Rijksmuseum.

Pieter van Ruijven (1624–1674), Vermeer's patron in Delft (and, at his death, the owner of twenty-one of the painter's works), probably bought the painting directly from the artist. Liedtke doubts that the patron ordered the subject matter. Ownership later passed on, perhaps to his widow, Maria de Knuijt, probably their daughter, Magdelene van Ruijven (1655–1681), and certainly to Van Ruijven's son-in-law, Jacob Dissius (1653–1695), whose estate sold it with other paintings by the artist in 1696. Records of that sale described The Milkmaid as "exceptionally good", and the work brought the second-highest price in the sale (175 guilders, exceeded only by the 200 guilders paid for Vermeer's cityscape, View of Delft.)

In 1765 the painting was auctioned by Leendert Pieter de Neufville. "The famous milkmaid, by Vermeer of Delft, artful", went through at least five Amsterdam collections before it became part of what The Metropolitan Museum of Art called "one of the great collectors of Dutch art", that of Lucretia Johanna van Winter (1785–1845). In 1822 she married into the Six family of collectors, and in 1908 her two sons sold the painting (as part of the famous Six collection of thirty-nine works) to the Rijksmuseum, which acquired the works with support from the Dutch government and the Rembrandt Society — but not before a good deal of public squabbling and the intervention of the States-General or Dutch parliament.

== Exhibitions ==
The painting has been exhibited in western Europe and in the United States. In 1872 it was part of an Amsterdam exhibition of "old masters" ("Tentoonstelling van zeldzame en belangrijke schilderijen van oude meesters"), for Arti et Amicitiae, a society of visual artists and art lovers, and in 1900 it was part of an exhibition at Stedelijk Museum Amsterdam. Other European exhibits showing the work include the Royal Academy of Arts ("Exhibition of Dutch Art", London) in 1929; Galerie nationale du Jeu de Paume ("Exposition hollandaise: Tableaux, aquarelles et dessíns anciens et modernes", Paris) in 1921; Museum Boijmans Van Beuningen ("Vermeer, oorsprong en invloed: Fabritius, De Hooch, De Witte", Rotterdam) in 1935.

It was exhibited at the 1939 World's Fair in New York City, and the outbreak of World War II during the fair – with the German occupation of the Netherlands – caused the work to remain in the U.S. until Holland was liberated. During this time it was displayed at the Detroit Institute of Arts in Michigan (the museum where the curator of the World's Fair exhibit was working), and was included in that museum's exhibition catalogues in 1939 and 1941. During the war, the work was also displayed at The Metropolitan Museum of Art in New York, where it was hanging as late as 1944, according to Leidtke. In 1953, the Kunsthaus Zürich displayed the painting in an exhibition, and the next year it traveled to Italy for an exhibition at the Palazzo delle Esposizioni in Rome and the Palazzo Reale in Milan. In 1966, it was part of an exhibition at the Mauritshuis in the Hague and the Musée de l'Orangerie in Paris. In 1999 and 2000 the painting was at the National Gallery of Art in Washington for its exhibition "Johannes Vermeer: The Art of Painting", and it was part of the "Vermeer and the Delft School" exhibition at the National Gallery, London from June 20 to September 16, 2001 (it did not appear at the Metropolitan Museum of Art venue of that exhibition, earlier that year).

The painting returned to New York in 2009, on the occasion of NY400, the 400th anniversary of Henry Hudson's historic voyage (Amsterdam to Manhattan), where it was the central feature of a Metropolitan Museum of Art exhibition "Vermeer's Masterpiece: The Milkmaid", alongside several of the museum's five Vermeer works and other Dutch Golden Age paintings.

The painting was exhibited online in a high-quality digital version after museum curators found that many people thought that a low-quality yellowed version of the image which was circulating on the Internet was a good reproduction of the image.

== See also ==
- Dutch Golden Age painting
- The Basket of Bread
- List of paintings by Johannes Vermeer
