= Girl Interrupted =

Girl Interrupted may refer to:

- Girl Interrupted at Her Music, a 1660 painting by Dutch artist Johannes Vermeer
- Girl, Interrupted, a 1993 memoir by Susanna Kaysen, whose title is a reference to Vermeer's painting
- Girl, Interrupted (film), the 1999 film made as an adaptation of Kaysen's book
- Girl Interrupted (album), a 2002 album by hip-hop recording artist Ms. Jade
