= Girl Reading a Letter at an Open Window =

1657–1659 painting by Johannes Vermeer

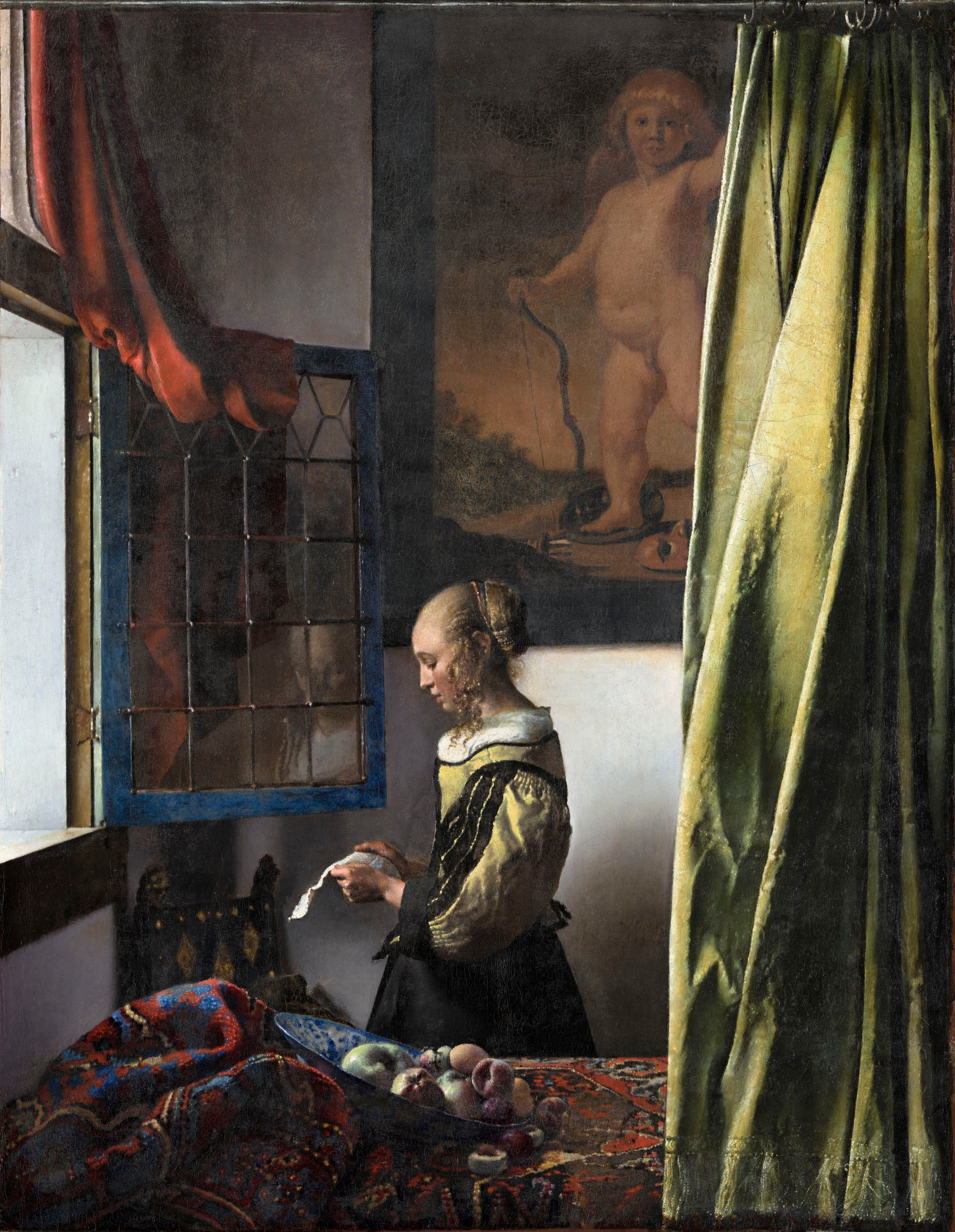
- Artist: Johannes Vermeer
- Year: c. 1657–1659
- Medium: Oil on canvas
- Dimensions: 83 cm × 64.5 cm (33 in × 25.4 in)
- Condition: Restored in 2021
- Location: Gemäldegalerie, Dresden

Girl Reading a Letter at an Open Window (Dutch: Brieflezend meisje bij het venster), also known as Lady reading at an open window, is an oil painting by Dutch Golden Age painter Johannes Vermeer. Completed in approximately 1657–1659, the painting is on display at the Gemäldegalerie in Dresden, which has held it since 1742. For many years, the attribution of the painting—which features a young Dutch woman reading a letter before an open window—was lost, with first Rembrandt and then Pieter de Hooch being credited for the work before it was properly identified in 1880. After World War II, the painting was briefly in possession of the Soviet Union. In 2017, tests revealed that the painting had been altered after the painter's death.

The painting was laboriously restored to its original composition between 2018 and 2021 using scalpel and microscope. It now shows Cupid in a "painting within a painting" on the wall, and since the restoration, hangs at the museum in Dresden as Vermeer painted it.

== Composition ==
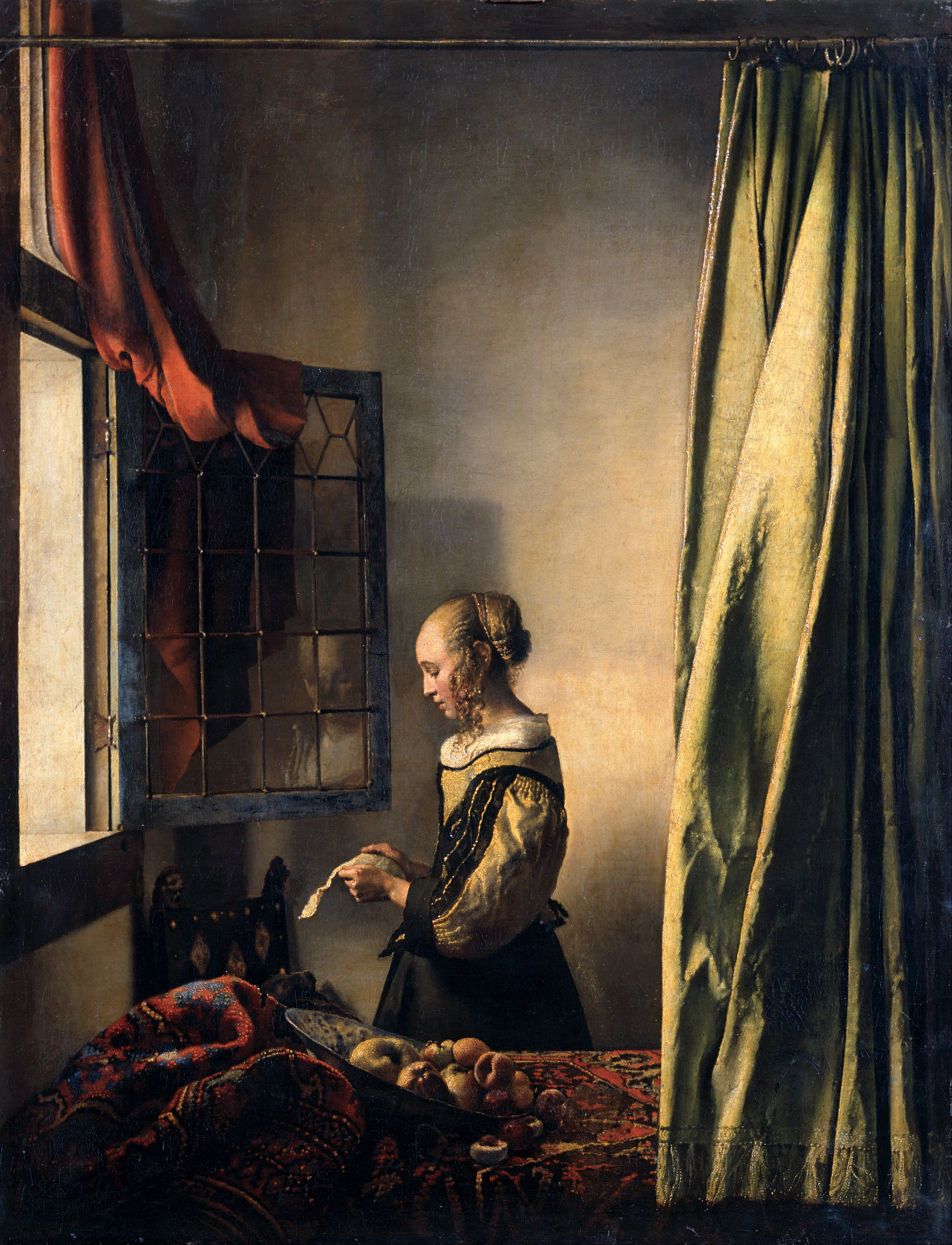
Painting as seen prior to 2021 restoration.

The painting as seen for nearly 300 years depicts a young Dutch blonde girl standing at an open window, in profile, reading a letter. A red drapery hangs over the top of the window glass, which has opened inward and which, in its lower right quadrant, reflects her. A tasseled ochre drapery in the foreground right, partially closed, masks a quarter of the room in which she stands. The color of the drape reflects the green of the woman's gown and the shades of the fruit tilted in a bowl on the red-draped table. On the table beside the bowl, a peach is cut in half, revealing its pit.

X-ray examination of the painting in the 21st century revealed an image on the wall behind the girl. Further work by conservator Christoph Schölzel in 2017 revealed that varnish on that part of the painting differed from the rest of the painting, and was clearly applied after Vermeer died. In 2019, it was decided by the Staatliche Kunstsammlungen Dresden (State Arts Collection in Dresden) to restore the painting to its original composition by Vermeer. The painting of Cupid on the wall behind the girl resembles a painting from Vermeer's own collection of art, a painting by Cesar van Everdingen.

The restoration allows the painting to be viewed in a new light: the depiction of Cupid on the wall suggests that the girl may be reading a love letter. Stephan Koja, director of the Gemäldegalerie Alte Meister (Old Masters Picture Gallery), wrote "beyond the superficially amorous context, it is a fundamental statement about the essence of true love."

== Symbolism and technique ==
In Vermeer, 1632–1675 (2000), Norbert Schneider wrote that the open window represents "the woman's longing to extend her domestic sphere" beyond the constraints of her home and society, while the fruit "is a symbol of extramarital relations." Schneider concludes that the letter is a love letter either planning or continuing her illicit relationship. He supports the conclusion by observing, as revealed by x-rays of the canvas, that the work as produced by Vermeer portrayed painting of a putto, likely representing Cupid, hanging on the wall in the upper right portion of the piece. Another person painted over the image in the late 18th century so that the wall appeared blank. The overpainting was reversed by a restoration project conducted by the museum Staatliche Kunstsammlungen Dresden from 2018–2021.

The draperies, hanging in the right foreground, are not an uncommon element for Vermeer, appearing in seven of his paintings. It is possible that the curtain on the right is referencing the common use of curtains to protect paintings. Even more common, the repoussoir appears in 25, with Girl Reading a Letter at an Open Window, one of three which feature a rug-covered table or balustrade between the figure and the viewer. It was the last painting in which Vermeer featured this device.

This painting and Officer and Laughing Girl represent the earliest known examples of the pointillé (not to be confused with pointillism) for which Vermeer became known. John Michael Montias in Vermeer and His Milieu (1991) points out the "tiny white globules" that can be seen in the brighter parts of both paintings, including the still life elements of both and the blond hair specifically in this work. This use of light may support speculation among art historians that Vermeer used a mechanical optical device, such as a double concave lens mounted in a camera obscura, to help him achieve realistic light patterns in his paintings.

== Restoration in 21st century ==
A major restoration completed in 2021 shows a painting of Cupid on the wall behind the reading girl, as well as brighter colors in the painting. Many have changed their view or interpretation of this painting, now that the "painting within a painting" has been revealed as part of the original work, covered up by someone long after Vermeer died. "Scholars believe that the newly revealed picture is meant to indicate that the woman is reading a love letter." and now the work is again on display for the public to offer their views.

== History ==
Vermeer completed the painting in approximately 1657–1659. In 1742, Augustus III of Poland, Elector of Saxony, purchased the painting under the mistaken belief that it had been painted by Rembrandt. In 1826, it was mis-attributed again, to Pieter de Hooch. It was so labelled when French art critic Théophile Thoré-Bürger came upon it, recognizing it as one of the rare works of the Dutch painter and restoring its proper attribution in 1860.

Girl Reading a Letter at an Open Window was among the paintings rescued from destruction during the bombing of Dresden in World War II. The painting was stored, with other works of art, in a tunnel in Saxony; when the Red Army encountered them, they took them. The Soviets portrayed this as an act of rescue; some others as an act of plunder. Either way, after the death of Joseph Stalin, the Soviets decided in 1955 to return the art to Germany, "for the purpose of strengthening and furthering the progress of friendship between the Soviet and German peoples." Aggrieved at the thought of losing hundreds of paintings, art historians and museum curators in the Soviet Union suggested that "in acknowledgment for saving and returning the world-famous treasures of the Dresden Gallery" the Germans should perhaps donate to them Girl Reading a Letter at an Open Window and Sleeping Venus by Giorgione. The Germans did not take to the idea, and the painting was returned. Well-preserved, it is on display at the Gemäldegalerie in Dresden.

== Painting materials ==
The painting was investigated by Hermann Kühn together with several other works of Vermeer in 1968. The pigment analysis has shown that Vermeer's choice of painting materials did not reveal any peculiarities as he used the usual pigments of the baroque period. The green drapery in the foreground is painted mainly in a mixture of blue azurite and lead-tin-yellow, while the lower part contains green earth. For the red drapery in the window and the red parts of the table covering Vermeer used a mixture of vermilion, madder lake and lead white.

== Legacy ==
This painting has been an inspiration to other artists, such as Tom Hunter, whose artistic photo interpretation of the somber tone of emotion and the bowl of fruit shows a young mother and her child reading an eviction notice. With the major restoration of the original painting by Vermeer, the question has been posed: “Will Tom Hunter now revisit his Kobal Photographic Portrait Award winning work to reveal a hidden image on the wall?”

== See also ==
- List of paintings by Johannes Vermeer
- Dutch Golden Age painting

== Bibliography ==
- Akinsha, Konstantin; Kozlov, Grigorii (April 1991). "Spoils of War". ARTnews. Archived from the original on 2010-10-25.
- Bailey, Martin (1995-10-26). Vermeer. Phaidon Press. ISBN 978-0-7148-3462-7.
- Cumming, Laura (2001-05-27). "Only Here for the Vermeer". The Observer.
- Huerta, Robert D. (2003). Giants of Delft: Johannes Vermeer and the natural philosophers : the parallel search for knowledge during the age of discovery. Bucknell University Press. ISBN 978-0-8387-5538-9.
- Huerta, Robert D. (2005). Vermeer and Plato: painting the ideal. Bucknell University Press. ISBN 978-0-8387-5606-5.
- Montias, John Michael (1991-01-01). Vermeer and His Milieu: A Web of Social History. Princeton University Press. ISBN 978-0-691-00289-7.
- Saltzman, Cynthia (2008-08-19). Old Masters, New World: America's raid on Europe's great pictures, 1880-World War I. Penguin Group. ISBN 978-0-670-01831-4.
- Schneider, Norbert (2000-05-17). Vermeer, 1632–1675: veiled emotions. Taschen. p. 49. ISBN 978-3-8228-6323-7.
- Shapiro, Gary (2003-04-15). Archaeologies of vision: Foucault and Nietzsche on seeing and saying. University of Chicago Press. ISBN 978-0-226-75047-7.
- Smith, Kathleen E. (2002). Mythmaking in the new Russia: politics and memory during the Yeltsin era. Cornell University Press. p. 60. ISBN 978-0-8014-3963-6.
