= Willem Blaeu =

Dutch cartographer, atlas maker and publisher (1571–1638)

Willem Janszoon Blaeu
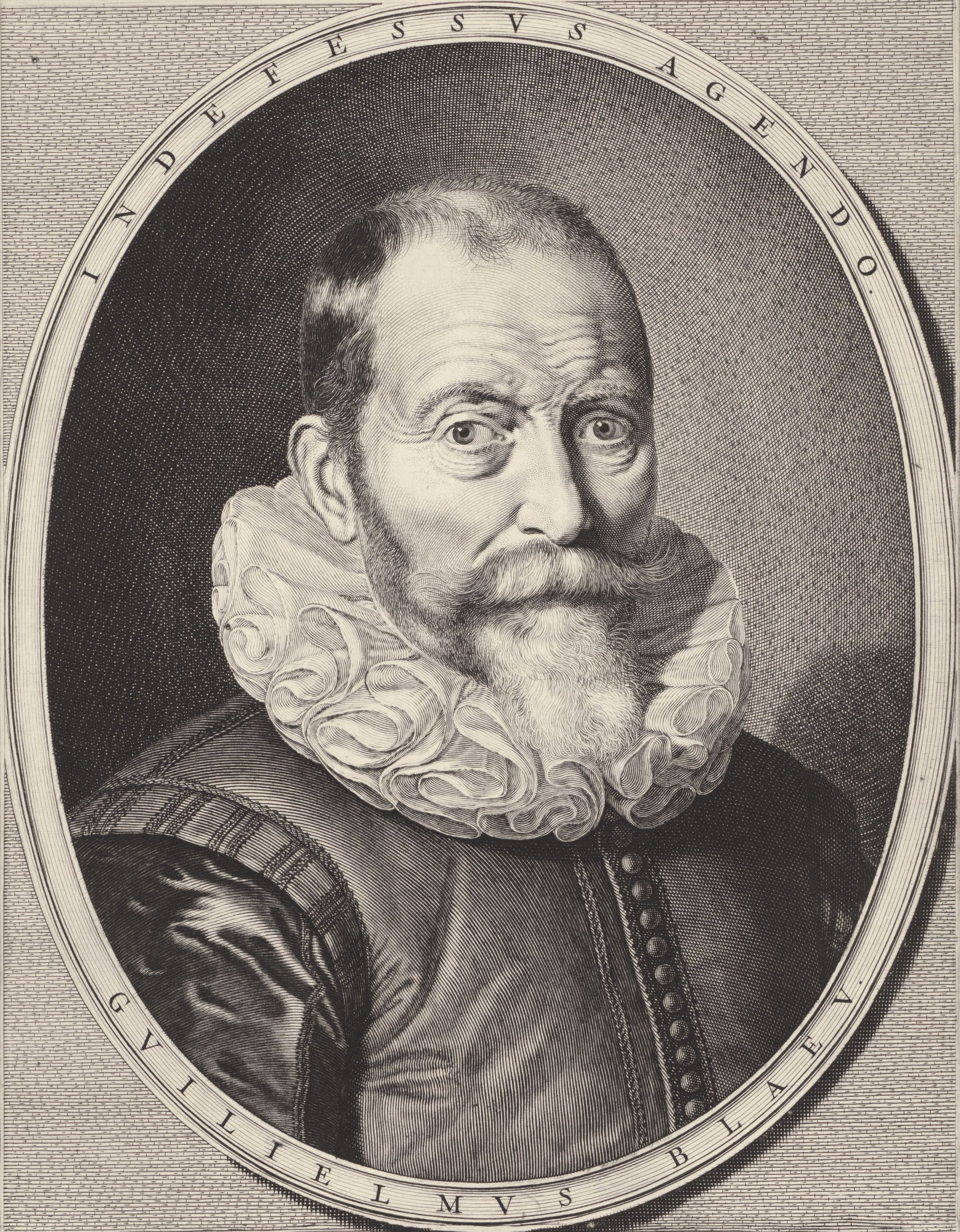
- Portrait by Jeremias Falck, 1655–1677
- Born: 1571; Uitgeest or Alkmaar, Spanish Netherlands
- Died: 21 October 1638 (aged 66–67); Amsterdam, Dutch Republic
- Other name: Willem Jansz. Blaeu
- Occupations: Cartographer; atlas maker; publisher

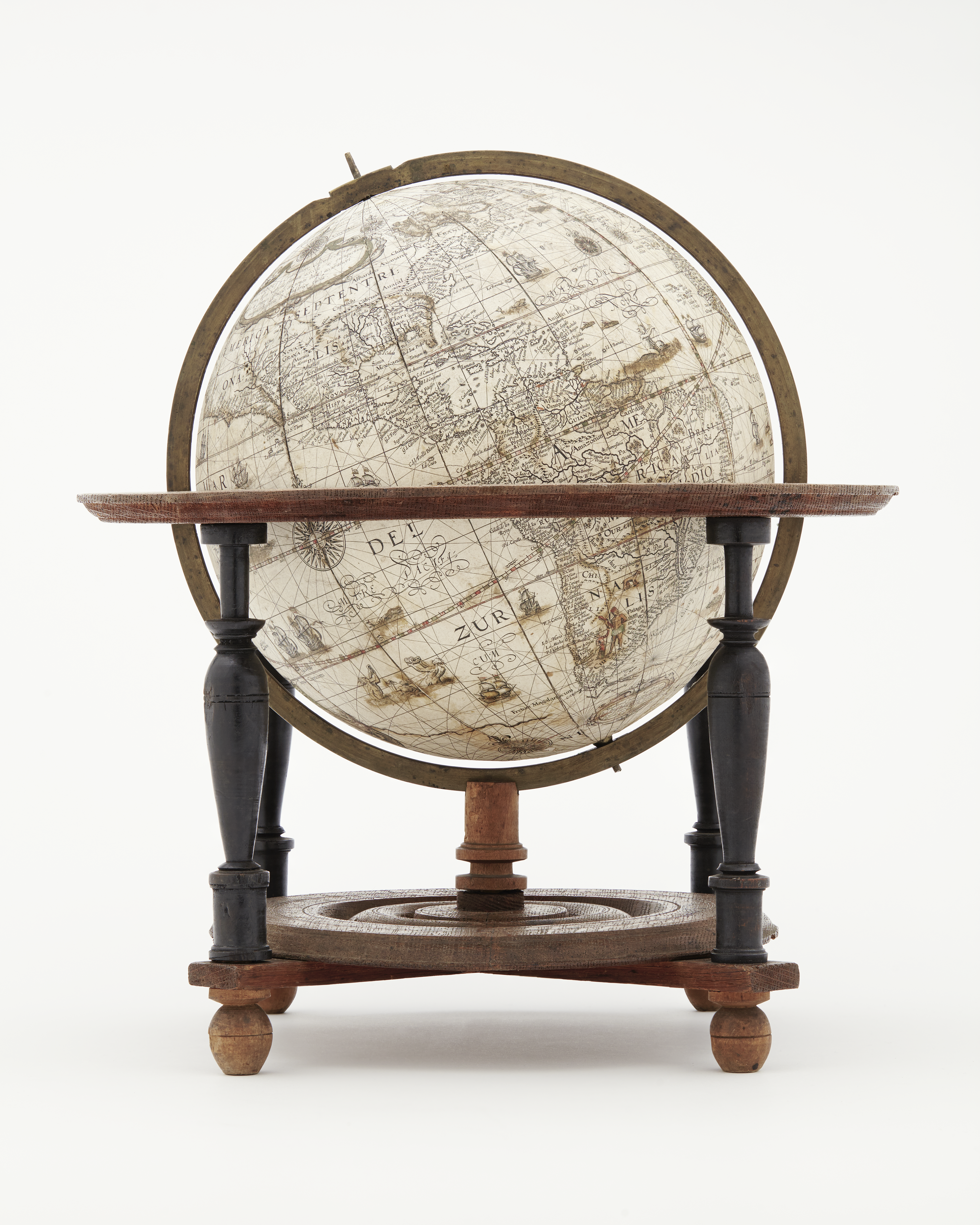
Globe from 1602. The workshop made globes in pairs: one to represent the heavens and another the Earth.

Willem Janszoon Blaeu (1571 – 21 October 1638), also known as Willem Jansz. Blaeu (Dutch pronunciation: [ˈʋɪləm ˈjɑnszoːn ˈblʌu] (Note: Janszoon in isolation: [ˈjɑnsoːn].)), was a Dutch cartographer, globe maker, and publisher. He was one of the leading figures of the Dutch school of cartography in the seventeenth century.

Trained in astronomy under Tycho Brahe between 1594 and 1596, Blaeu established a workshop in Amsterdam where he produced globes, nautical charts, and maps. These works formed the basis of a series of atlases, including the Atlas Novus (1635), and were widely used in navigation and geographic study.

In 1633 he was appointed mapmaker to the Dutch East India Company. After his death in 1638, his business was continued by his sons, including Joan Blaeu, who later published the multi-volume Atlas Maior, one of the most extensive atlases of the seventeenth century.

== Biography ==
=== Early life ===
Willem Janszoon Blaeu was born in 1571 at Alkmaar or Uitgeest, in the Dutch Republic, the son of Stijntge and Jan Willemsz., a prosperous herring merchant. He was destined to succeed his father in the trade, but his interests lay more in mathematics and astronomy.

=== Career ===
Between 1594 and 1596, as a student of the Danish astronomer Tycho Brahe, he qualified as an instrument and globe maker. He would also become a well established cartographer. He made country maps and world globes, and as he possessed his own printing works, he was able to regularly produce country maps in an atlas format, some of which appeared in the Atlas Novus published in 1635.

In 1600, Blaeu observed a star in the constellation Cygnus that had not previously been recorded. On 8 August of that year he measured its position using nearby stars, including Vega and Albireo, as reference points. The star initially appeared as a third-magnitude star but later decreased in brightness. It was later identified as a variable star and is now known as P Cygni.

In 1633, he was appointed map-maker of the Dutch East India Company. He was also an editor and published works of Willebrord Snell, Descartes, Adriaan Metius, Roemer Visscher, Gerhard Johann Vossius, Barlaeus, Hugo Grotius, Vondel and the historian and poet Pieter Corneliszoon Hooft.

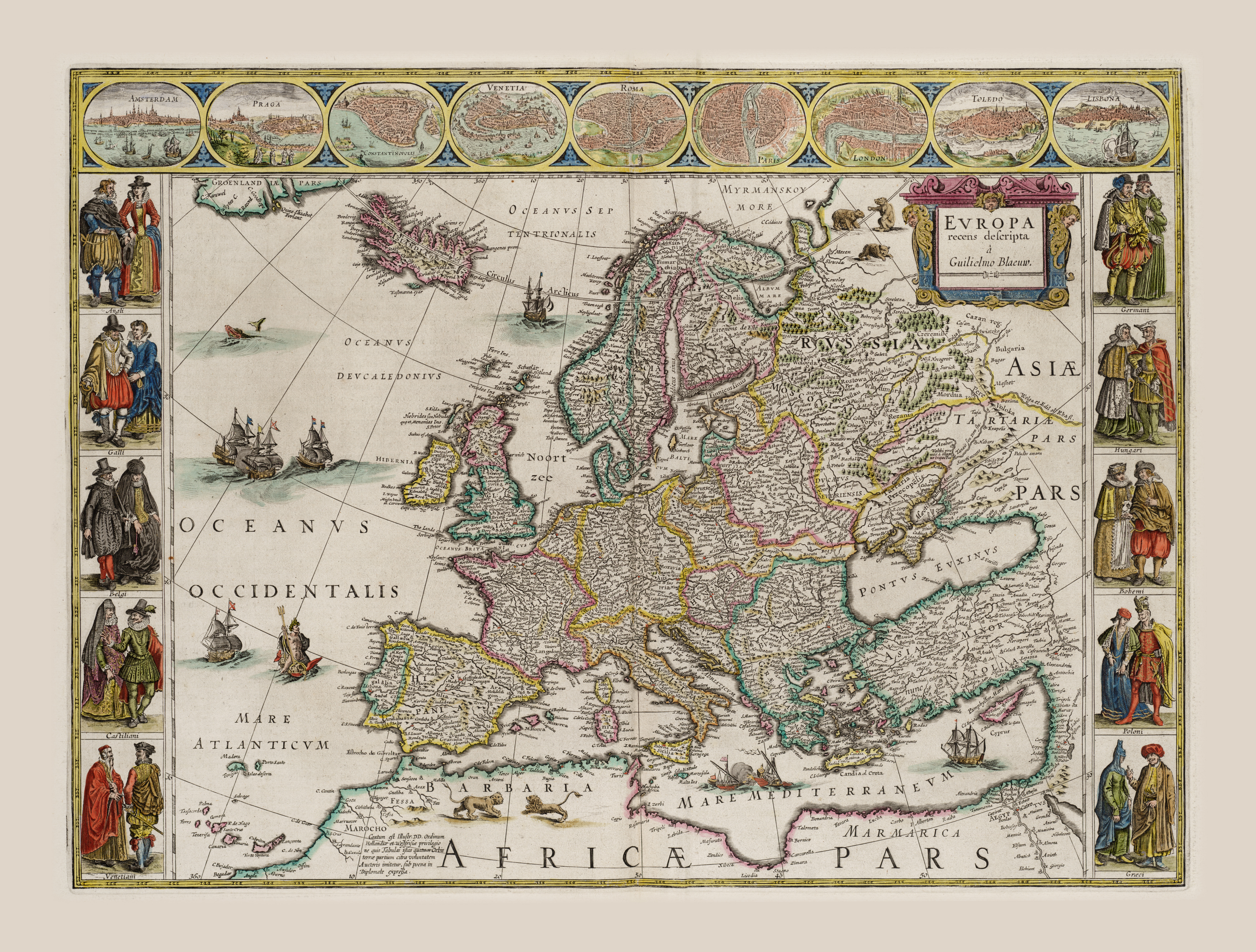
Blaeu's 1630 map of Europe

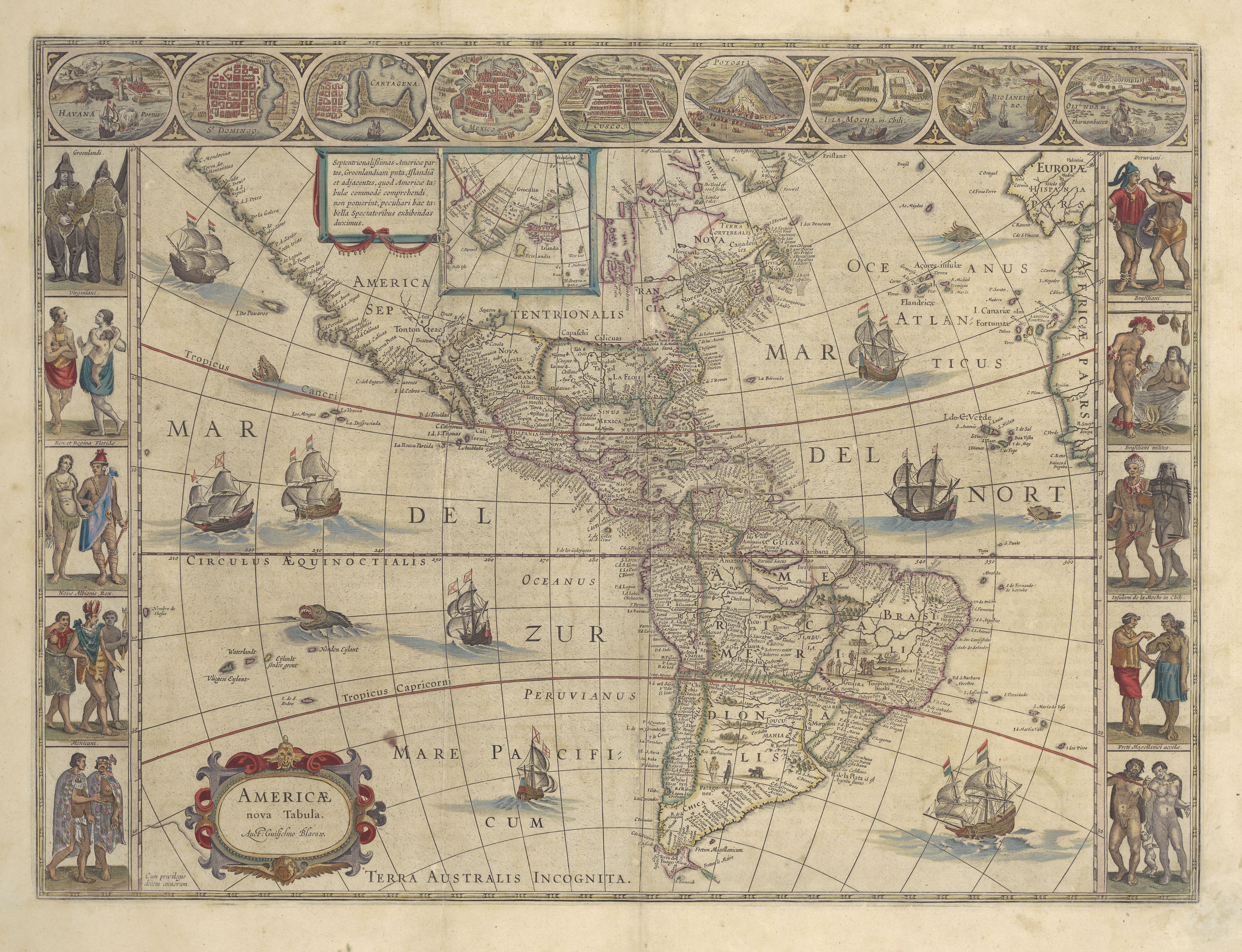
Blaeu's 1614 map of the Americas

=== Later life and death ===
Willem Janszoon Blaeu died in Amsterdam on 21 October 1638. After his death, the publishing and cartographic business passed to his sons Joan Blaeu and Cornelis Blaeu, who continued their father's work. Cornelis died in 1644, after which Joan Blaeu carried on the enterprise. He later completed his father's atlas project, publishing the multi-volume Atlas Major, one of the most extensive atlases produced in the seventeenth century.

== Legacy ==
=== Blaeu's maps in the paintings of Johannes Vermeer ===
Maps produced by Blaeu appear in several paintings by the Dutch Golden Age artist Johannes Vermeer. Vermeer frequently included wall maps and globes in his interior scenes, and these objects are often depicted with sufficient detail to allow historians to identify specific printed examples.

One of the most clearly identifiable examples is the wall map of Holland and West Friesland designed by Balthasar Florisz van Berckenrode and published by Blaeu in 1621. The map appears prominently in Vermeer's painting Officer and Laughing Girl, where its geography and decorative cartouches are visible behind the figures. A similar map also appears in Woman Reading a Letter.

Cartographic material produced by the Blaeu firm also appears in Vermeer's painting The Geographer, where a sea chart on the wall has been identified as a chart published by the Blaeu workshop.

His maps later formed the basis of the Atlas Maior, a large multi-volume atlas completed by his son Joan Blaeu and regarded as one of the major achievements of seventeenth-century Dutch cartography.

== Works published by Willem Blaeu ==
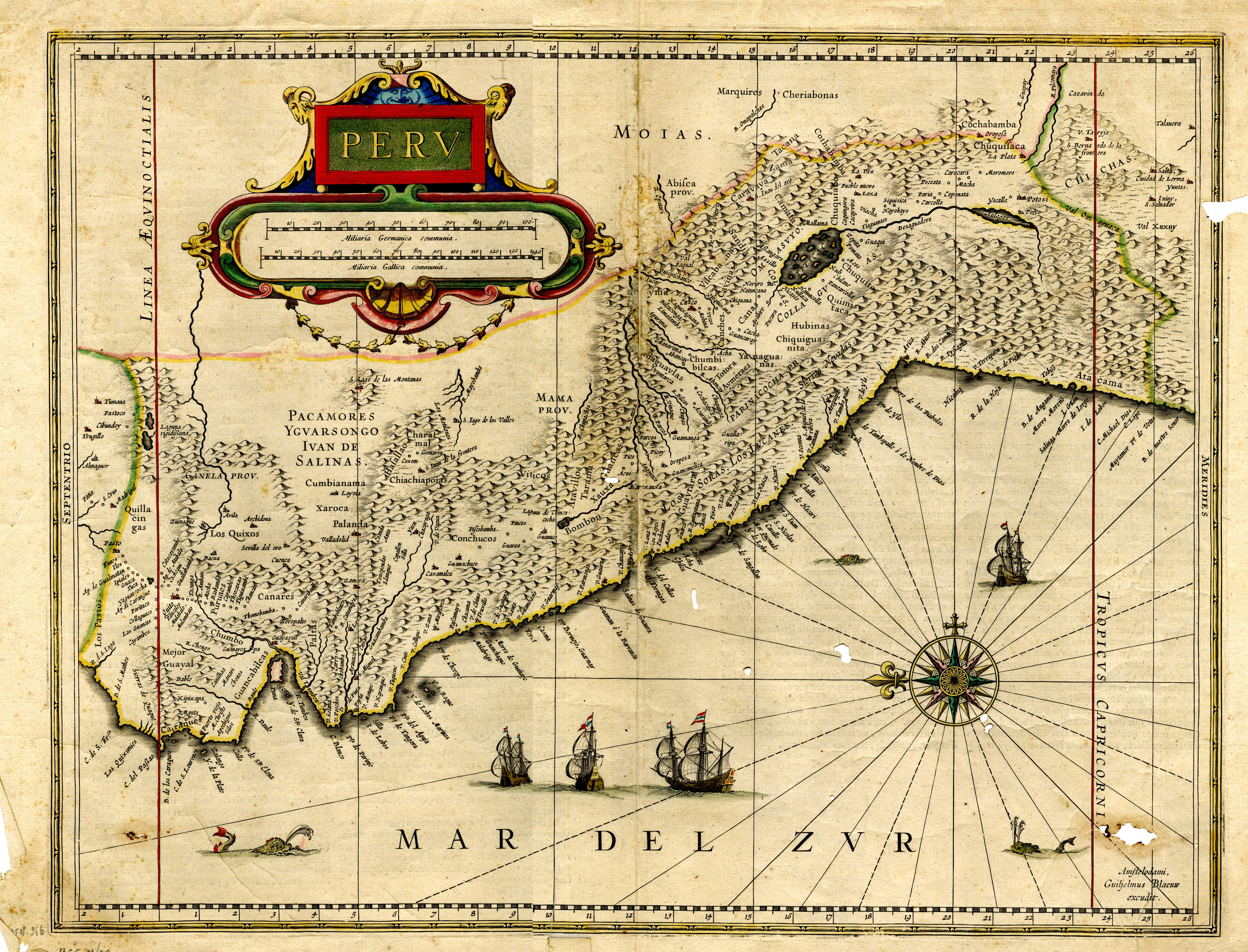
Blaeu's map of the Viceroyalty of Peru and the south Pacific Ocean.

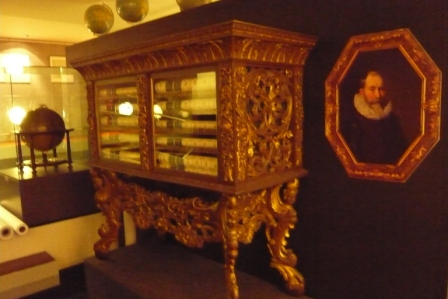
Joan & Willem Blaeu Atlas in 11 volumes with white leather binding with gold leaf and special chest to hold it in, with a portrait of Willem Blaeu on the wall next to it, copy owned by the University of Amsterdam Special Collections

- Aardglobe (1599)
- Hemelglobe (1603)
- Nieuw Graetboeck (1605)
- Nywe Paskaerte (1606)
- 't Licht der zeevaert (1608)
- Spieghel der Schrijfkonste (1609)
- "Nova et Accurata Totius Hollandiae Westfriesiaeq. Topographia, Descriptore Balthazaro Florentio a Berke[n]rode Batavo"
- Tafelen van de declinatie der Sonne (1623)
- Tafelen van de breedte van de opgang der Sonne
- Zeespiegel, inhoudende een korte onderwysinghe inde konst der zeevaert, en beschryvinghe der seen en kusten van de oostersche, noordsche, en westersche schipvaert (1624)
- Pascaarte van alle de zeecusten van Europa (1625)
- Tweevoudigh onderwijs van de Hemelsche en Aerdsche globen; het een na de meyning van Ptolemævs met een vasten aerdkloot; het ander na de natuerlijcke stelling van N. Copernicus met een loopenden aerdkloot.
- Atlantis Appendix (1630)
- Appendix Theatri ... et Atlantis ... (1631)
- Atlas (1634)
- Novus Atlas (1635)
- Theatrum Orbis Terrarum (1635)
- Toonneel des Aerdrycks (1635)
- Le Theatre du Monde (1635)
- Theatre du monde ou Nouvel Atlas (1638)

== See also ==
- Hessel Gerritsz
- Cartography in the Dutch Republic
- History of cartography

== Literature ==
- Krogt, van der, Peter CJ (2000), Koeman's Atlantes Neerlandici II: The Folio Atlases Published by Willem Jansz. Blaeu and Joan Blaeu, Houten: Hes & De Graaf publishers BV, ISBN 90-6194-438-4
- P. J. H. Baudet: Leven en werken van Willem Jansz. Blaeu, Utrecht 1871.
- Johannes Keuning and Marijke Donkersloot-de Vrij (Edited): Willem Jansz. Blaeu: a biography and history of his work as cartographer and publisher, Amsterdam 1973. ISBN 90-221-1253-5
