= List of paintings by Johannes Vermeer =

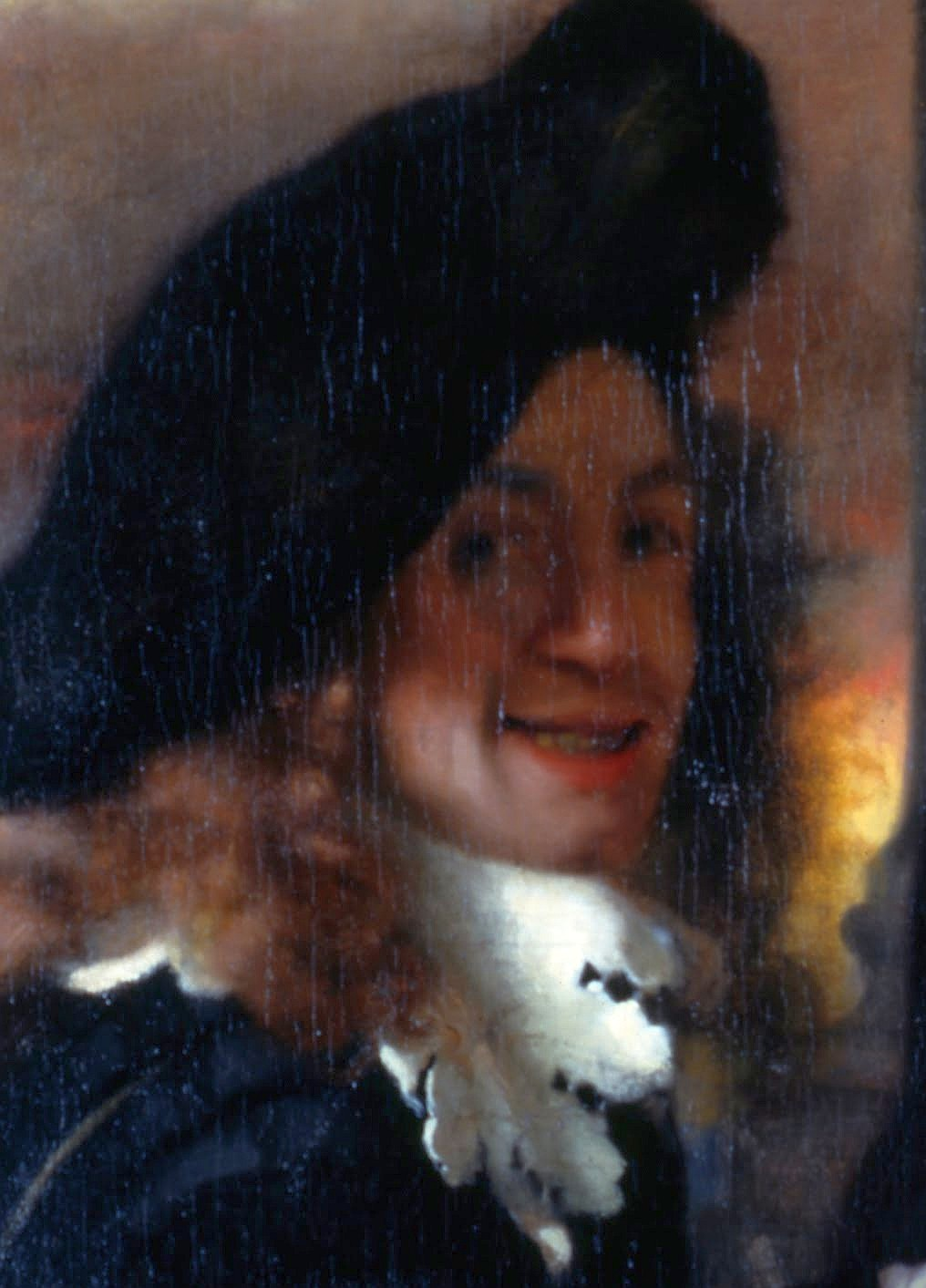
Detail of the painting The Procuress (c. 1656), proposed self portrait by Vermeer

The following is a list of paintings Attributed to Johannes Vermeer (1632–1675), a Dutch Golden Age painter. After two or three early history paintings, he concentrated almost entirely on genre works, typically interiors with one or two figures. Vermeer's paintings of the 1660s are generally more popular than his work from the 1670s: in the eyes of some, his later work is colder.

Today, 34 paintings are firmly attributed to him, with question marks over a further three. This compares to the 74 pictures attributed to him by Théophile Thoré-Bürger in 1866. Vermeer's reputation increased greatly during the latter half of the 20th century, a period during which the number of paintings ascribed to him shrank greatly. This is partly because he has been one of the most widely forged artists, and many forgeries have now been identified. No drawings or preparatory paintings are known. Many Vermeer paintings are known by various names, and alternative names are noted below. Years of creation are only estimates for most of the paintings, and sources often give different, though not widely divergent, estimates. In addition to the known paintings listed below, historical documents seem to describe at least six other, lost, works.

== Paintings by Johannes Vermeer ==
Image	Title	Year	Size	Location
	Christ in the House of Martha and Mary	1654–55 or c. 1654–56 or c. 1655	Oil on canvas, 160 × 142 cm	National Gallery of Scotland, Edinburgh
	Saint Praxedis	1655	Oil on canvas, 101.6 x 82.6 cm	Kufu Company Inc., Tokyo; On loan to the National Museum of Western Art, Tokyo
	Diana and Her Companions	1655–56 or c. 1653–54	Oil on canvas, 98.5 × 105 cm	Mauritshuis, The Hague
	The Procuress	1656 (signed and dated)	Oil on canvas, 143 × 130 cm	Gemäldegalerie Alte Meister, Dresden
	Girl Reading a Letter at an Open Window (also known as Young Woman Reading a Letter at an Open Window)	1657 (or c. 1657–59)	Oil on canvas, 83 × 64.5 cm	Gemäldegalerie Alte Meister, Dresden
	A Girl Asleep (also known as A Maid Asleep)	1657 (or 1656–57)	Oil on canvas, 87.6 × 76.5 cm	Metropolitan Museum of Art, New York
	The Little Street	1657–58 or c. 1658 or c. 1658–60	Oil on canvas, 54.3 × 44 cm	Rijksmuseum, Amsterdam
	Officer with a Laughing Girl (also known as Officer and Laughing Girl)	c. 1657	Oil on canvas, 50.5 × 46 cm	Frick Collection, New York
	The Milkmaid	c. 1658 or c. 1657–58	Oil on canvas, 45.5 × 41 cm	Rijksmuseum, Amsterdam
	The Wine Glass, also known as A Lady Drinking and a Gentleman and The Glass of Wine	1658–60 or 1658–59	Oil on canvas, 39.4 × 44.5 cm	Gemäldegalerie, Berlin
	The Girl with the Wineglass	c. 1659	Oil on canvas, 78 × 67.5 cm	Herzog Anton-Ulrich-Museum, Braunschweig
	View of Delft	1659–60	Oil on canvas, 98.5 × 117.5 cm	Mauritshuis, The Hague
	Girl Interrupted at Her Music	1660–61 (or 1658–59)	Oil on canvas, 39.4 × 44.5 cm	Frick Collection, New York
	Woman Reading a Letter	1663–64 (or 1657–59)	Oil on canvas, 46.6 × 39.1 cm	Rijksmuseum, Amsterdam
	The Music Lesson (also known as A Lady at the Virginals with a Gentleman)	1662/65	Oil on canvas, 73.3 × 64.5 cm	Royal Collection, Buckingham Palace, London
	Woman with a Lute	c. 1663–64 or 1662–63	Oil on canvas, 51.4 × 45.7 cm	Metropolitan Museum of Art, New York
	Woman with a Pearl Necklace	1662–64	Oil on canvas, 55 × 45 cm	Gemäldegalerie, Berlin
	Woman with a Water Jug, also known as Young Woman with a Water Pitcher	1660–62 or c. 1662	Oil on canvas, 45.7 × 40.6 cm	Metropolitan Museum of Art, New York
	Woman Holding a Balance, also known as Woman with a Balance	1662–63 or c. 1663–64	Oil on canvas, 42.5 × 38 cm	National Gallery of Art, Washington
	A Lady Writing a Letter	1665–66	Oil on canvas, 45 × 40 cm	National Gallery of Art, Washington
	Girl with a Pearl Earring, also known as Girl in a Turban, Head of Girl in a Turban, The Young Girl with Turban, and Head of a Young Girl.	c. 1665	Oil on canvas, 46.5 × 40 cm	Mauritshuis, The Hague
	The Concert	1665–66	Oil on canvas, 72.5 × 64.7 cm	Missing since its theft from the Isabella Stewart Gardner Museum, Boston in 1990
	Portrait of a Young Woman, also known as Study of a Young Woman	1666–67 or c. 1665–67	Oil on canvas, 44.5 × 40 cm	Metropolitan Museum of Art, New York
	The Allegory of Painting, also known as The Art of Painting	1666–67 or c. 1666–68	Oil on canvas, 100 × 120 cm	Kunsthistorisches Museum, Vienna
	Mistress and Maid, also known as Lady with her Maidservant Holding a Letter	1667/68	Oil on canvas, 90.2 × 78.7 cm	Frick Collection, New York
	Girl with a Red Hat (attribution to Vermeer has been questioned)	1668 or c. 1665–67	Oil on panel, 22.8 × 18 cm	National Gallery of Art, Washington
	The Astronomer	1668	Oil on canvas, 50.8 × 46.3 cm	Louvre, Paris
	The Geographer	1668/69	Oil on canvas, 53 × 46.6 cm	Städelsches Kunstinstitut, Frankfurt am Main
	The Lacemaker	1669/70	Oil on canvas, 24.5 × 21 cm	Louvre, Paris
	The Love Letter	1669/70	Oil on canvas, 44 × 38.5 cm	Rijksmuseum, Amsterdam
	A Young Woman Seated at the Virginals	c. 1670	Oil on canvas, 25.2 × 20 cm	Leiden Collection, United States
	Lady Writing a Letter with her Maid	1670	Oil on canvas, 71.1 × 58.4 cm	National Gallery of Ireland, Dublin
	The Allegory of Faith, also known as Allegory of the Faith	1671–74 or c. 1670–72	Oil on canvas, 114.3 × 88.9 cm	Metropolitan Museum of Art, New York, USA
	The Guitar Player	1672	Oil on canvas, 53 × 46.3 cm	Kenwood House, London, England
	Lady Standing at a Virginal, also known as Young Woman Standing at a Virginal	1673–75 or c. 1670–72	Oil on canvas, 51.7 × 45.2 cm	National Gallery, London
	Lady Seated at a Virginal, also known as Young Woman Seated at a Virginal	1673–75 or c. 1670–72	Oil on canvas, 51.5 × 45.5 cm	National Gallery, London

== Disputed paintings ==
Image	Title	Year	Size	Location
	Girl with a Flute, said to be by a "friend" or imitator of Vermeer by the National Gallery, however the Rijksmuseum claims it to be authentic	1665–70	Oil on panel, 20 x 17.8 cm	National Gallery of Art, Washington, D.C.

== Lost works ==
Historical documents such as auction records suggest that Vermeer painted a number of other works, now presumably destroyed, lost to public view, or possibly wrongly attributed to other artists. While a list of these lost Vermeers must necessarily be tentative, it may include:

- a self-portrait
- a painting of a man washing his hands
- a second street scene (the first being The Little Street)
- a Visit to the Tomb – possibly Biblical
- a mythological painting including Jupiter
- a relatively early painting described as a 'face by Vermeer'

== Sources ==
- Bonafoux, Pascal. Vermeer. New York: Konecky & Konecky, 1992. ISBN 1-56852-308-4
- Cant, Serena. Vermeer and His World 1632–1675, Quercus Publishing Plc, 2009. ISBN 978-1-84866-001-4
- Wheelock, Arthur K. Vermeer: The Complete Works. New York: Harry N. Abrams, 1997. ISBN 0-8109-2751-9
