= The Little Street =

1657–1658 painting by Johannes Vermeer

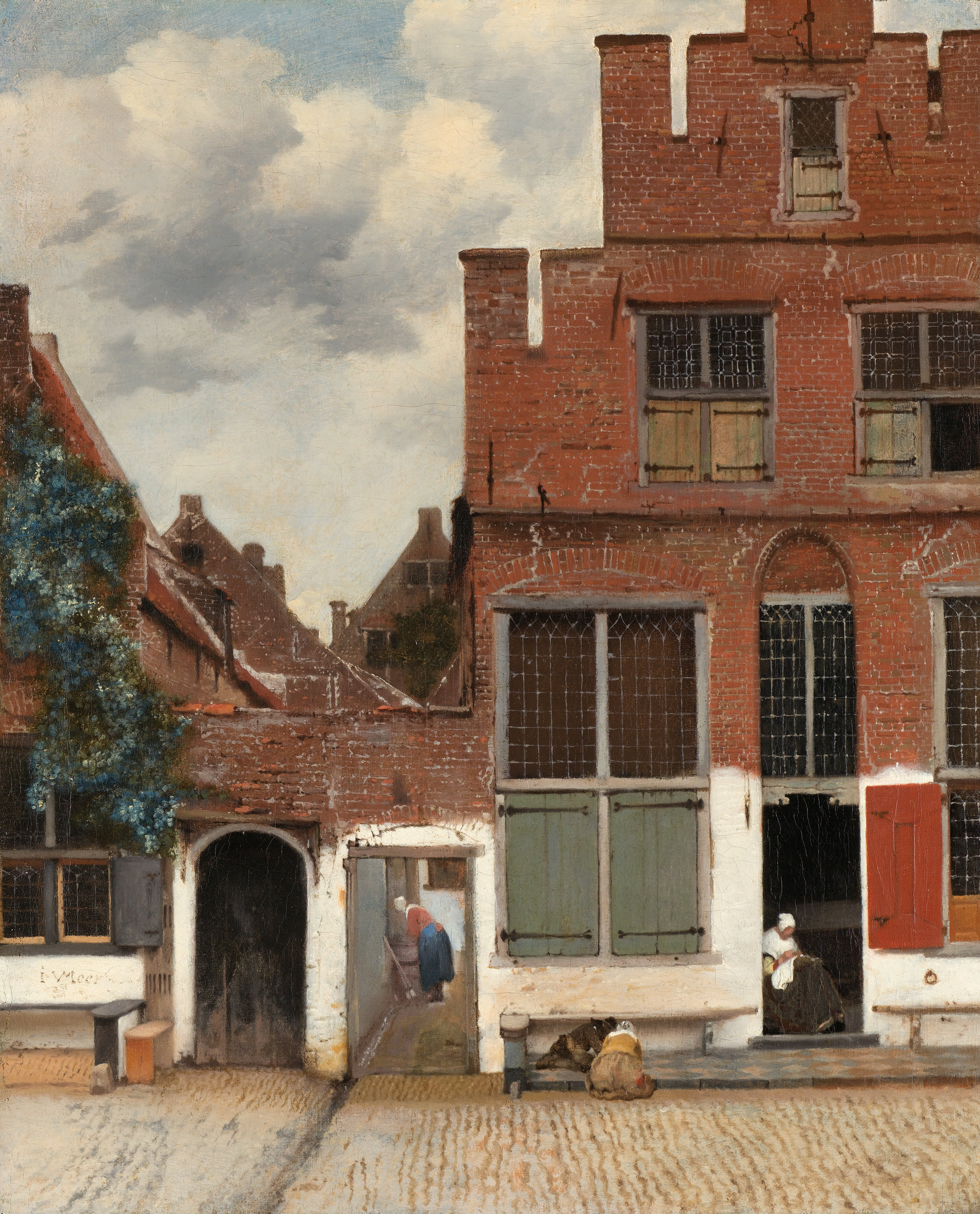
- Artist: Johannes Vermeer
- Year: c. 1657–1658
- Medium: Oil on canvas
- Movement: Baroque painting
- Dimensions: 54.3 cm × 44 cm (21.4 in × 17 in)
- Location: Rijksmuseum; Amsterdam
- Owner: Pieter van Ruijven

The Little Street (Het Straatje) is a painting by the Dutch painter Johannes Vermeer, executed c. 1657–1658. It is exhibited at the Rijksmuseum of Amsterdam, and signed, below the window in the lower left-hand corner, "I V MEER".

== Painting ==
The painting is made in oil on canvas, and it is a relatively small painting, being 54.3 centimetres (21.4 in) high by 44.0 centimetres (17.3 in) wide.

The painting, showing a quiet street, depicts a typical aspect of the life in a Dutch Golden Age town. It is one of only three Vermeer paintings of views of Delft, the others being View of Delft and the now lost House Standing in Delft. This painting is considered to be an important work of the Dutch master.

Straight angles alternate with the triangle of the house and of the sky giving the composition a certain vitality. The walls, stones and brickwork are painted in a thicker paint layer, such that it makes them almost palpable.

== Painting materials ==
Vermeer achieved the realistic depiction of the surfaces with the masterful application of a relatively limited number of pigments. He employed red ochre and madder lake for the reddish-brown brick wall, the blue in the sky contains lead white and natural ultramarine. The green shutters and foliage are painted with azurite mixed with lead-tin-yellow.

== Location ==
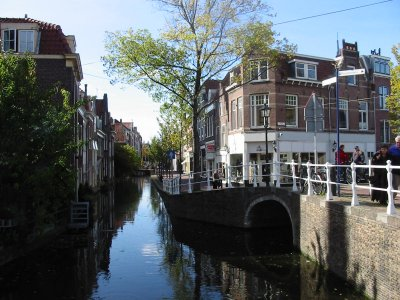
Voldersgracht, where the artist grew up in Delft

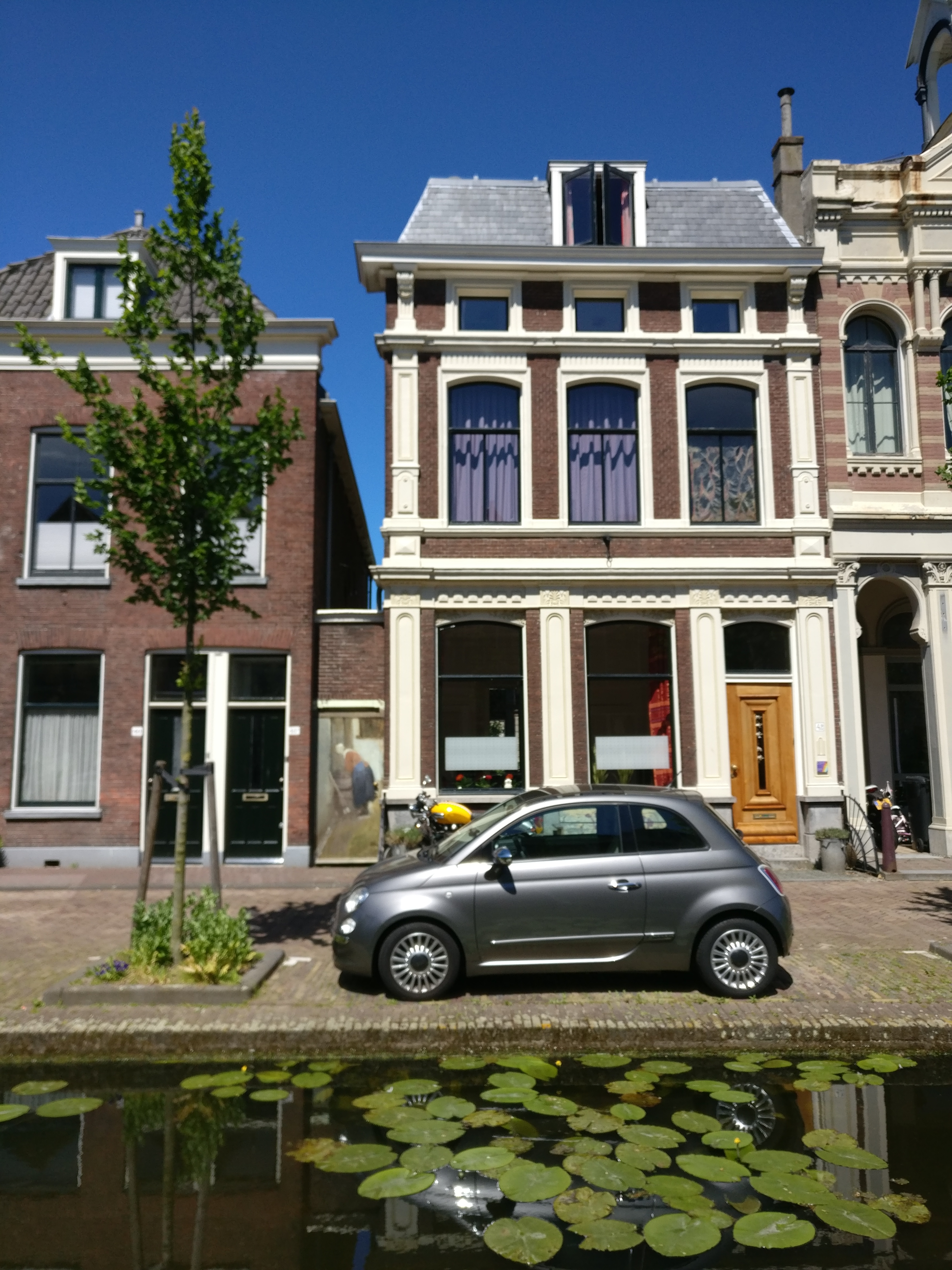
Present-day Vlamingstraat in Delft

While generally agreed to depict a contemporary street scene in 17th-century Delft, where Vermeer lived and worked, the exact location of the scene Vermeer painted has long been a topic of research and discussion, with studies arguing for the Voldersgracht, where the Vermeer Centre is located, or the Nieuwe Langendijk at the present-day numbers 22 to 26.

In 2015, archival research based on the city's quay dues register, which gives detailed measurements of all houses and passageways along the canals of Delft at the time, has resulted in the conclusion that the site is Vlamingstraat, a street with a narrow canal, at the present-day numbers 40 and 42. The research also found that the property on the right in the painting belonged to Vermeer’s aunt, Ariaentgen Claes van der Minne. She had a business selling tripe, and the passageway beside the house was known as the Penspoort, or Tripe Gate. Vermeer’s mother and sister also lived on the same canal, diagonally opposite. Further research showed that the buildings and tree behind the house as seen on the painting match with period correct maps of the location. Also the location of the outlet sewer of the 'tripe' gutter running from the left doorway to the canal is correct in this present day.

== See also ==
- Dutch Golden Age painting
- List of paintings by Johannes Vermeer
