= Woman with a Pearl Necklace =

Painting by Johannes Vermeer from c. 1664

- Vrouw met parelsnoer (Dutch), Junge Dame mit Perlenhalsband (German)
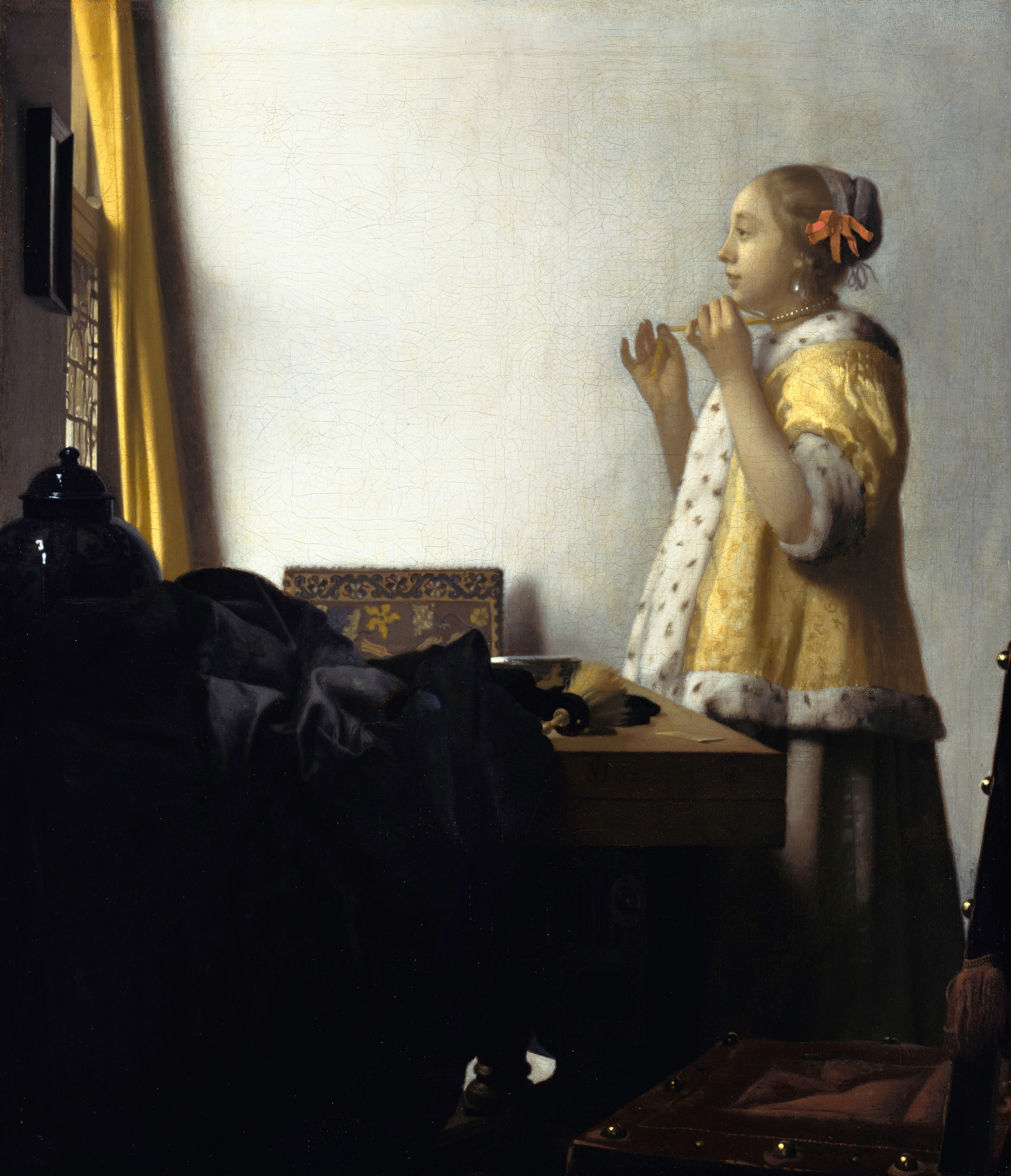
- Artist: Johannes Vermeer
- Year: c. 1664
- Medium: oil on canvas
- Movement: Dutch Golden Age painting
- Dimensions: 55 cm × 45 cm (21 5/8 in × 17 3/4 in)
- Location: Gemäldegalerie, Berlin
- Owner: Staatliche Museen

Woman with a Pearl Necklace by Johannes Vermeer is a Dutch Golden Age painting of about 1664. Painted in oils on canvas, Johannes Vermeer portrayed a young Dutch woman, most likely of upper-class descent, dressing herself with two yellow ribbons, pearl earrings, and a pearl necklace. As a very popular artist of the 17th century, the Dutch Golden Age, Vermeer depicted many women in similar circumstances within interior, domestic scenes. The same woman also appears in The Love Letter and A Lady Writing a Letter. The painting is part of the collection of the Gemäldegalerie in Berlin.

== The artist ==
Johannes Vermeer (1632- 1675) of Delft was one of Netherlands' most prominent Dutch painters. Specialising in interior scenes, Vermeer developed a distinct style for his many domestic paintings. Popular with middle-class patrons, Vermeer offered glimpses into the lives of Holland's cultured citizens. Although little is known and/ or proven about Vermeer's life, historians do know of his baptism and life in Delft where he was raised by a craftsman father and married a Catholic girl by the name of Catherina Bolnes. This marriage may have caused him to convert to Catholicism.

As an innkeeper and art dealer, Vermeer painted dozens of paintings in which specific attributes can be noted. These attributes include the use of yellow and blue tones, the depiction of women, the use of wall coverings (maps, artworks, etc.), depiction of domestic tools, heavy drapery, light angles from the left, as well as prominent and telling facial expressions, and narrative-like objects. These touches allowed Vermeer to idealize his depiction of Dutch women and their values. Some of his most notable works include Girl with a Pearl Earring, The Love Letter, and The Art of Painting, all of which share the aforementioned qualities of a true Vermeer painting.

== Description ==
Painted in 1664, this 21 5/8 X 17 ¾ inch scene depicts a young Dutch woman looking left toward a window's light source. Dressed in a yellow, fur-trimmed coat, this young woman most likely comes from an upper-class family. With Vermeer's distinctive style, it incorporates the color yellow, a draped curtain, framed pictures on the walls, a light source from the left, as well as domestic tools, and an expressive profile.

For example, to the far left, a yellow, drawn back curtain is used. With a rich tone of lemon yellow to complete the woman's jacket, Vermeer is able to create a balance between the two ends of his painting. The window that the curtain would cover is very similar to that in his painting Woman with a Water Jug.

On that same side of the wall, Vermeer displays a framed mirror. The black frame is most likely made of ebony, which indicates wealth and status. The fact that Vermeer uses a mirror is also distinctive. Vermeer associated the sense of reflection to portray the woman with vanity or feminine power. Also due to Vermeer's interest in certain Greek muses, he used the mirror to portray duality. However, according to the Essential Vermeer Website, other historians believe this mirror may indicate a Dutch theme of vanitas or the reminder of death. However, there is not a specific way historians can determine this.

A large portion of the painting happened to be the white walls. This allows the painter to set a stage for his main subject, the young woman. Without any distraction on the wall behind her, the viewer can look more to the main figure's expression and actions. The young woman is definitely the most descriptive part of the piece. Like many of his other featured women, she is portrayed in a yellow, fur-trimmed morning coat. Comparing these trims, historians can investigate how Vermeer painted. From the microscopic brush strokes, historians can decipher many thin layers of gray and white, which reveal Vermeer's attempt to create realism. Like Vermeer, during the Baroque period many Dutch artists were striving for simple, clear, and natural realism. These coats also give historians a glimpse into the period. In the middle 1660s, many Dutch interiors were filled with a variety of furs. These pieces were commonly used during long Dutch winters. These styles of furs were actually recorded in Vermeer's home in 1676.

The woman's facial expression is also telling. As she seems to be finishing up her morning routine, the young woman is caught clasping her pearl necklace together. Her facial expression stares blankly and almost vainly ahead of herself, possibly out the window or into the black-framed mirror. The woman retains a nice profile yet blank look. This three quarter pose was very common to the period and revealed a distinct quality of Dutch Baroque painting.

Another important aspect of Vermeer's Woman with Pearl Necklace is the placement of the domestic tools on the table. A water basin, comb, and powder brush are all displayed on the table. This painting may suggest criticism towards a young upper-class women's frivolity, lack of occupation, and her ample time for petty activities.

Lastly, the deep blue tablecloth draped over the left side of the painting brings strong contrast to the work. Vermeer needed to create a contrast spot in order to maintain the geometric layout of the painting.

== Style ==
Even when mixed with the numerous examples of Dutch Baroque painting, Vermeer's works are very distinctive. Painted in the mid-1600s, this particular piece had a very common theme. A woman at "her toilet" was popular among Dutch painters.

Vermeer was uniquely talented. He specially used a unique version of toning in which he used shades of browns and grays to line out his work. He most likely then used more structured colors like red, yellows, and blues (his favorites) as glazed tones to add texture to certain aspects of this painting. Some historians speculate that Vermeer used camera obscura to create this artwork. If this hypothesis is true, he could have been able to use perspective lighting to create the piece. Vermeer most likely used the pigment Lapis Lazuli to make his works distinctive. Very expensive material, Lapis Lazuli was used in tiny amounts to create distinctive pigment for most of his works.

Additionally, as mentioned before, Vermeer used a cadre of special features in his domestic works. Those include lighting from the left side of the painting, domestic tools, the pigment yellow and blue, Women, expressive faces, framed windows, mirrors, or walls, and large draped curtains or table cloths.

== In popular culture ==
In the 1981 film Arthur, Martha unwraps the newly purchased painting (called Woman Admiring Pearls) while demanding her grandson consent to an arranged marriage.

== See also ==
- Girl with a Pearl Earring
- List of paintings by Johannes Vermeer
