= Officer and Laughing Girl =

Painting by Johannes Vermeer c. 1657

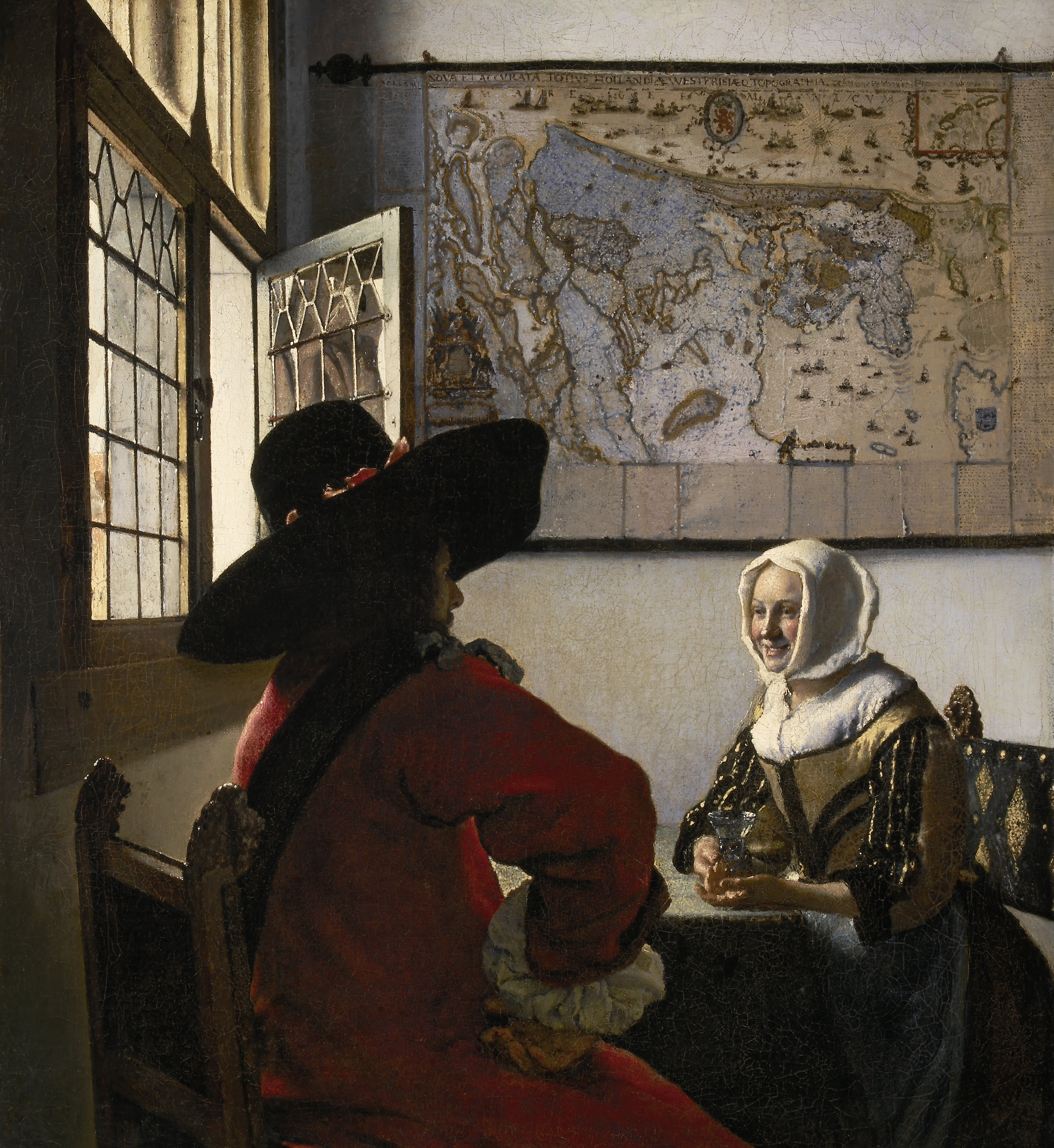
- Artist: Johannes Vermeer
- Year: c. 1657
- Medium: Oil on canvas
- Movement: Dutch Golden Age painting
- Dimensions: 50.5 cm × 46.0 cm (19.9 in × 18.1 in)
- Location: Frick Collection; New York

Officer and Laughing Girl, also known as Officer and a Laughing Girl, Officer With a Laughing Girl or, in Dutch, De Soldaat en het Lachende Meisje (literally, The Soldier and the Laughing Girl), is an oil painting on canvas executed ca. 1657 by the Dutch artist Johannes Vermeer. Its dimensions are 50.5 by 46 cm. It belongs to the Frick Collection in New York, along with Girl Interrupted at Her Music and Mistress and Maid.

Officer and Laughing Girl includes many of the characteristics of Vermeer's style. The main subject is a woman in a yellow dress, light is coming from the left-hand side of the painting from an open window, and there is a large map on the wall by Balthasar Florisz. van Berckenrode. Each of these elements occur in some of his other paintings, although this painting differs slightly with the man also sitting at the table. Art historians, who have suggested conflicting interpretations of the work, believe that a painting by Gerard van Honthorst inspired the composition and that Vermeer may have used a camera obscura to create the perspective in this painting.

== Subject and interpretation ==
The main subject is the woman at the center, whose face is illuminated by soft, direct light. She resembles Vermeer's wife, Catharina Bolnes, who is believed to have posed for many of his paintings. With x-ray photographs, art historians have determined that Vermeer had originally planned to paint the woman with a large white collar, which would have hidden much of her yellow dress. Also, her cap was later extended to cover all of her hair, drawing more attention to her face and expression. This yellow bodice with braiding appears in many of Vermeer's other portraits; it is called a schort and was usually worn as an everyday, common dress. Over her dress the woman wears a blue apron, mostly hidden in the shadows of the table. Blue aprons were common attire at that time because they hid stains well. Art historians have interpreted this to mean that the soldier has surprised the girl with an impromptu visit during her morning chores. The woman holds a wine glass, usually used for white wine. Because at that time wine cost more than beer, it indicates her wealth.

The cavalier in the foreground wears a red coat and an expensive hat, displaying his wealth and rank. His hat is wide-brimmed and made of beaver pelt, which was weather-resistant and good for snowy and rainy conditions. The pelts for these hats were imported from the New World, in this case probably from New Netherland, present-day eastern United States, which was at the time controlled by the Dutch West India Company. The red in his uniform is associated with power and passion, bringing a passionate and emotional note to the painting. His rank as an officer is indicated by the black sash he wears. His striking presence in the immediate foreground brings drama and depth to the mood of the composition. This artistic device—in which an object is placed in the foreground to increase the depth of field of the overall painting is called repoussoir. Caravaggio often used this technique, and Vermeer probably learned it from paintings of Caravaggio's imitators.

The nature of the interaction between the woman and the soldier can only be conjectured. Many art historians believe that it only portrays a woman being innocently and honorably courted by this soldier. However, some have suggested that her open hand and smile could indicate a discreet willingness to engage in sex.

Officer and Laughing Girl is one of several paintings in which Vermeer depicted maps or globes. The map that hangs on the wall in this painting is identifiable as a Willem Blaeu – Balthasar Florisz van Berckenrode map of Holland and West Friesland, which Vermeer must have owned, as he used it in three of his paintings. Peter van der Krogt wrote that "Vermeer's gift for realism is evidenced by the fact that the wall map, mounted on linen and wooden rods, is identifiable as Blaeu's 1621 map ... He captures all of its characteristic design, decoration, and geographic content."

== The Window ==
External videos
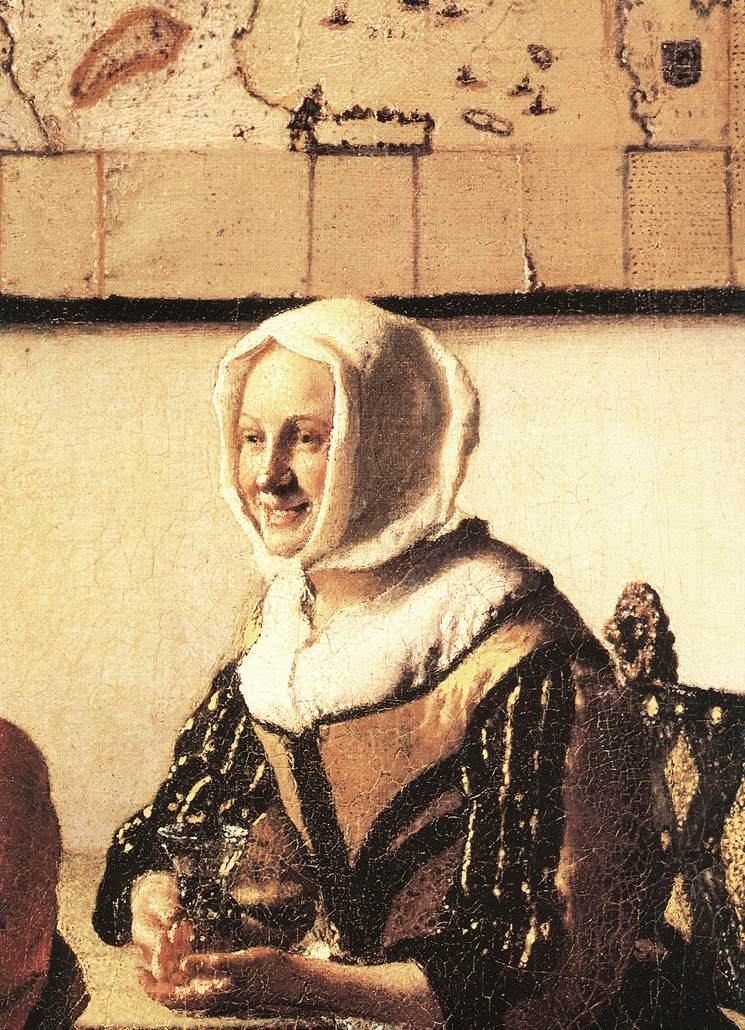
- Johannes Vermeer, Officer and Laughing Girl, Frick Collection, 1 min. 48 sec.

Gentle sunlight streaming through a side window in a manner strikingly similar to that in The Milkmaid and Girl Reading a Letter at an Open Window is a characteristic quality of Vermeer's interior paintings. (A commonality perhaps attributable to Vermeer using his own studio as a model for these settings.) Only bright light shines through, the window slanting at too steep an angle to disclose much else of the exterior. Yet the subtle gradations in tone of the window panes, the delicate interplay between reflection and translucency, the warped shimmer of the outside world—these are rendered with remarkable grace.

== Camera obscura ==
It has been conjectured that Vermeer used a camera obscura as an aid to the rendering of perspective. (Like a modern camera, a camera obscura projects an image onto a darkened chamber's inner surface, allowing a painter to reproduce the resulting scene in fine detail.) While there is no historical evidence that Vermeer used such a device, the theory is supported by the presence of what appear to be optical artifacts peculiar to glass lenses but not to the human eye: chromatic aberration and bokeh depth of field (see Tim's Vermeer).

== Painting materials ==
The older pigment analysis by W. Kuhn and also the more recent data collection of Costaras revealed the use of pigments typical to the Baroque period: ochres, lead-tin-yellow, natural ultramarine, and azurite.

== See also ==
- List of paintings by Johannes Vermeer
- Dutch Golden Age painting
