= The Love Letter (Vermeer) =

1669–1670 painting by Johannes Vermeer

- Artist: Jan Vermeer
- Year: c. 1669–1670
- Medium: Oil on canvas
- Movement: Dutch Golden Age painting
- Dimensions: 44 cm × 38.5 cm (17 in × 15.2 in)
- Location: Rijksmuseum Amsterdam, Amsterdam

The Love Letter (Dutch: De liefdesbrief) is a 17th-century genre painting by the Dutch artist Johannes Vermeer. The painting shows a servant maid commenting to her mistress on a letter the woman holds. The painting is in the Rijksmuseum Amsterdam.

== Description ==
The tied-up curtain in the foreground creates the impression that the viewer is looking at an intensely private, personal scene. There is also an element of trompe-l'œil as Dutch paintings were often hung with little curtains to conserve them, and the device of painted curtains is seen in other Dutch works of the period. The diagonals on the chequered floor create the impression of depth and three-dimensionality. The fact that it is a love letter that the woman has received is made clear by the fact that she is carrying a cittern, a form of lute used in the period as a symbol of love - often carnal love; luit was also a slang term for vagina. This idea is further reinforced by the slippers at the very bottom of the picture. The removed slipper was another symbol of sex. The floor brush would appear to represent domesticity, and its placement at the side of the painting may suggest that domestic concerns have been forgotten or pushed aside.

The colors blue and gold are important in the composition of the painting. In the household where The Love Letter is set, gilded ornamentation indicates substantial wealth. The gold is located on the woman's dress, the top of the fireplace, and many of the objects, which complements the blue on the floor, the maid's dress, the picture frames, etc. Classical influence is also apparent in the ionic columns of the fireplace.

The two paintings on the wall are also significant. The lower painting is of a stormy sea, a metaphor for tempestuous love. Above it is a landscape painting of a traveler on a sandy road. This may refer to the absence of the man who is writing to the lady. The Love Letter remains the only one of Vermeer's works to incorporate a seascape.

== Provenance ==
In the second half of the 17th century, the painting probably found its place in the collection of the Polish–Lithuanian Commonwealth's monarch John III Sobieski. The 1696 inventory of the Wilanów Palace in Warsaw lists among Dutch paintings "a painting of a lady, playing a lute in a golden robe, while a girl gives her a letter in the black frames (obraz damy, grającej na lutni w złotej szacie, a dziewczyna list jey oddaje w ramach czarnych)".

== Theft ==
On September 23, 1971, the painting was stolen from its display at The Centre for Fine Arts, Brussels, where it was on loan from the Rijksmuseum. The thief, 21-year-old Mario Pierre Roymans, had locked himself in an electrical closet until the museum was closed. He then took the painting off the wall and tried to escape out of a window. However, when the frame failed to fit through the window, he cut the canvas from its frame with a potato peeler and hid the painting in his back pocket. Roymans first concealed the painting in his room at his place of work, The Soetewey (or Soete-Wey) Hotel. Later he buried it in a forest, but when it started to rain, he recovered it and hid it in his room inside his pillowcase.

Roymans is thought to have been motivated by news of the bloodshed, rape, and murder of the 1971 Bangladesh genocide. On October 3, 1971, using the name "Tijl van Limburg" (a character similar to Robin Hood), Roymans contacted the Brussels newspaper Le Soir and asked for a reporter to meet him in a forest with a camera. He drove the reporter, blindfolded, to a church and unveiled the painting from a white cloth cover. After letting the reporter take photos of the canvas in the car's headlights, he drove him back. He told the reporter that he actually loved art, but also loved humanity. After the encounter, the pictures were published, alongside Roymans' conditions: 200 million Belgian francs to be given to famine-stricken Bengali refugees in East Pakistan. Roymans additionally requested the Rijksmuseum in Amsterdam and the Centre for Fine Arts in Brussels organize campaigns in their respective countries to raise money to combat world famine. Roymans set the deadline for these demands to be due Wednesday, October 6.

The police took the photographs as evidence and asked an art expert to validate that they were of the actual painting. It was confirmed they were, but immediately after the confirmation, the director of the Rijksmuseum, Arthur van Schendel, said that the photos were not sufficient proof of authenticity. In the following days Roymans continued to make contact with the media; he was finally apprehended by police on the day of his deadline after calling a newspaper.

The painting was returned to the Rijksmuseum on October 8 but wasn't announced to the public until October 11. It was in very poor condition after being cut crudely out of its stretcher bars and frame. The restoration took almost a year. Roymans was given a court fine and sentenced to two years in prison, but only served six months.

== See also ==
- List of paintings by Johannes Vermeer
- Dutch Golden Age painting
