= The Wine Glass =

1660 painting by Johannes Vermeer

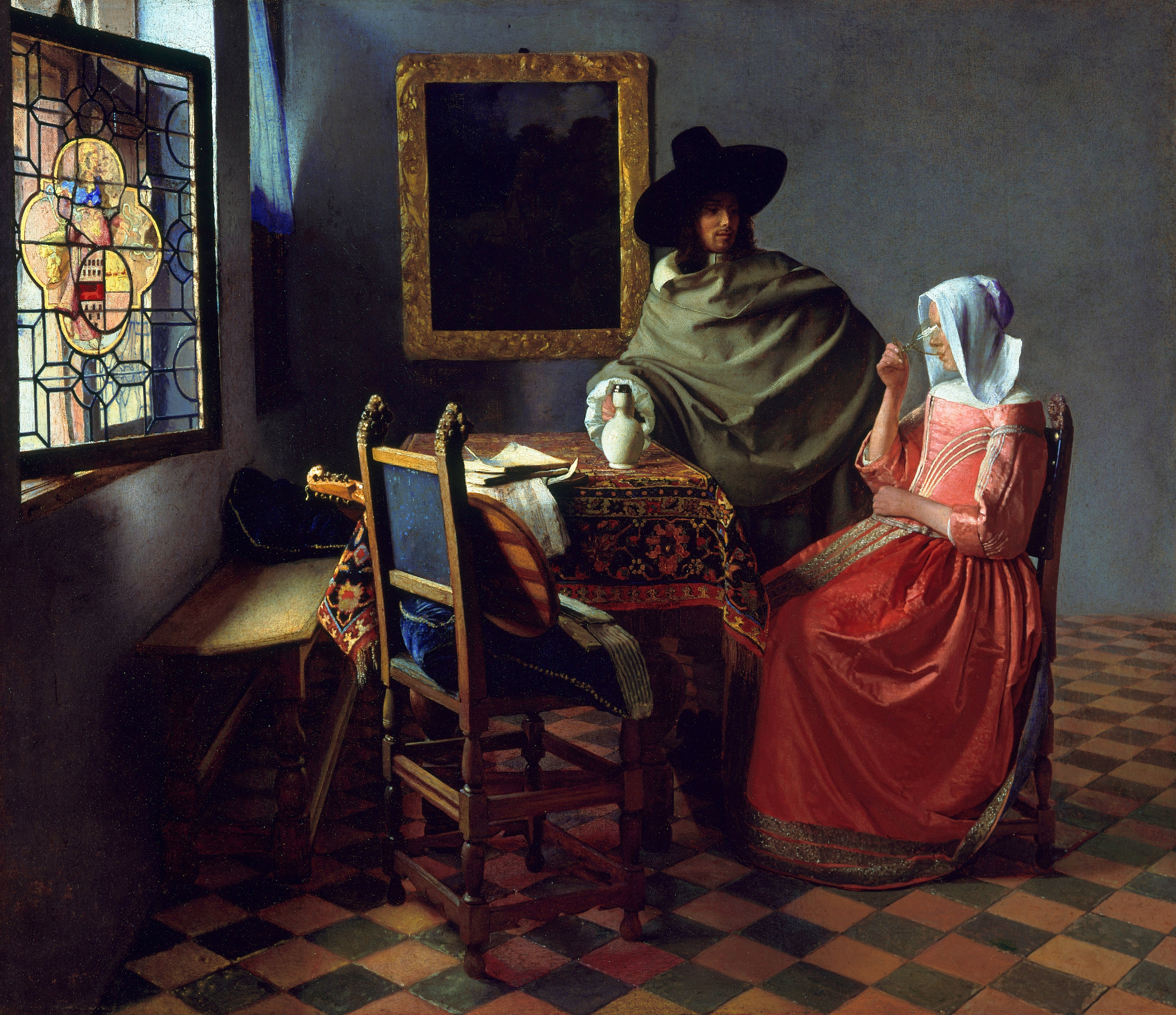
- Artist: Johannes Vermeer
- Year: 1650s
- Medium: canvas, paint
- Dimensions: 67.7 cm (26.7 in) × 79.6 cm (31.3 in)
- Location: Gemäldegalerie
- Accession: 912C

The Wine Glass (also The Glass of Wine or Lady and Gentleman Drinking Wine, Dutch: Het glas wijn) is an oil-on-canvas painting by Johannes Vermeer, created c. 1660, now in the Gemäldegalerie, Berlin. It portrays a seated woman and a standing man drinking in an interior setting.

The work contains the conventions of genre painting of the Delft School developed by Pieter de Hooch in the late 1650s. It contains figures situated in a brightly lit and spacious interior, while its architectural space is highly defined. The figures are set in the middle ground rather than the more usual foreground.

== The painting ==
Pieter de Hooch, A Dutch Courtyard, circa 1657

Vermeer was about 27 when he painted The Glass of Wine, and according to the critic Walter Liedtke, "No analysis of artistic conventions can suggest the sheer beauty and extraordinary refinement of a painting like The Glass of Wine, which may be considered one of Vermeer's first fully mature works".

The concept of figures drinking around a table, and a woman drinking from a glass are taken directly from De Hooch's A Dutch Courtyard. However, Vermeer's work breaks away from the prototypes of De Hooch in that the interior is rendered in a far more elegant and higher-class setting than the older master's works. The clothes of the figures, the patterned tablecloth, the gilded picture frame hanging on the back wall, and the coat of arms in the stained window glass all suggest a wealthier setting.

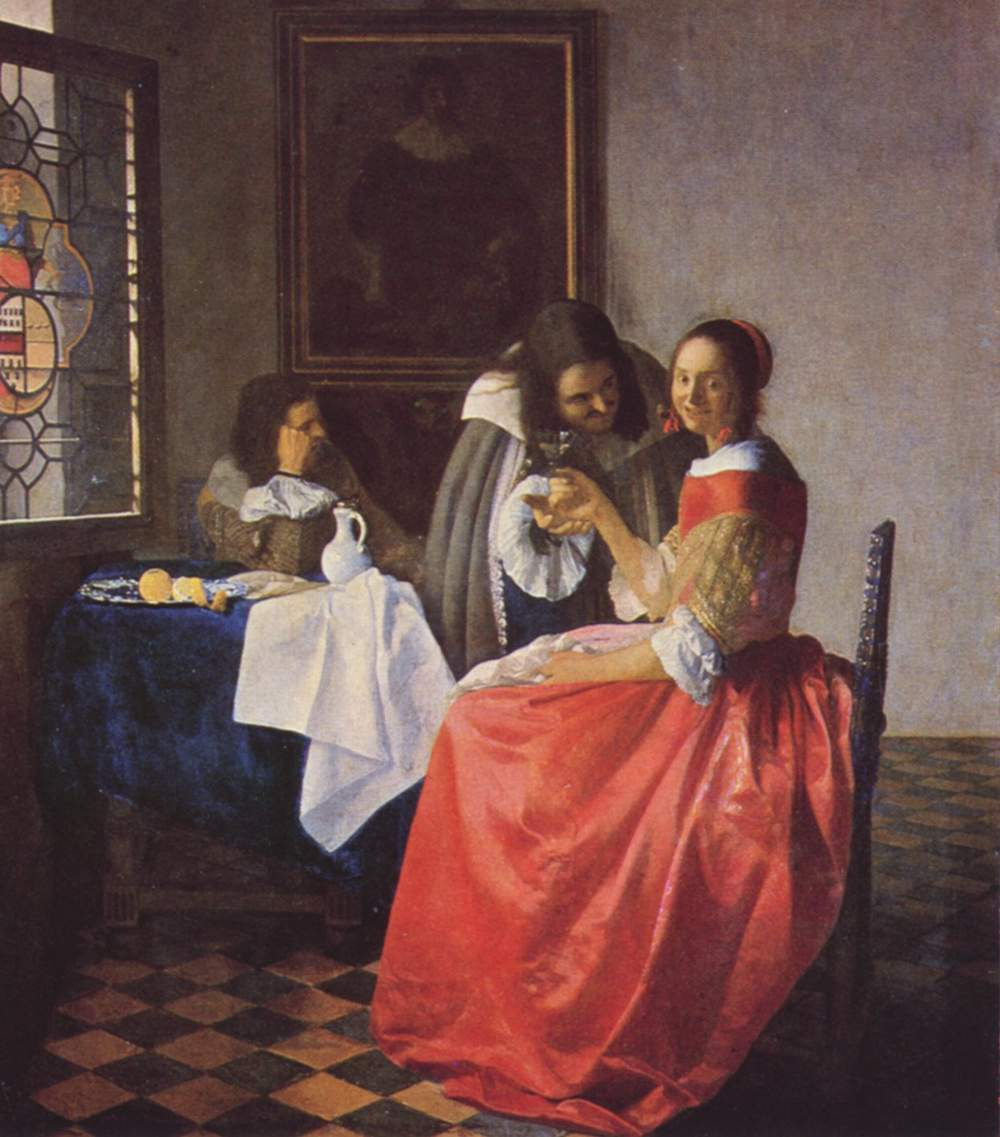
Johannes Vermeer, The Girl with the Wine Glass (1659–1660)

The scene likely represents some type of courtship, but the roles played by the two figures are unclear. The woman has just drained the glass of wine and the man seems impatient to pour her more, almost as if he is trying to get her drunk. A musical instrument, the cittern, lies on the chair with musical notebooks. But the figure of Temperance is depicted in the stained glass window, adding to the tension in the scene.

Compared to his earlier paintings, Vermeer's brushwork in The Wine Glass is subdued, while the faces and clothes of the figures are depicted with wide smooth outlines. The artist applied especially fine and detailed, linear brush strokes in the tapestry of the tablecloth and the window glass. At the time, Vermeer was not the only Dutch artist attempting to develop the ideas of De Hooch; contemporary paintings from Jan Steen, Gerard Ter Borch, and Frans van Mieris the Elder also display a refined technique.

The painting shares elements with other Vermeer works. The Girl with the Wine Glass (1659–1660) portrays two men, but in common with The Wine Glass it has a woman seated at a table with a glass of wine, and the tiled floors and stained-glass windows in both are very similar. The same wine pitcher appears in an earlier Vermeer, A Girl Asleep (1657).

The Wine Glass is considered an early and transitional painting, and as such, is not commonly viewed as one of Vermeer's finest works. According to art critic Lawrence Gowing, comparing the work with Gabriel Metsu's The Duet, it "lacks the sociable fluency, the ingratiating inventiveness".

== See also ==
- List of paintings by Johannes Vermeer

== Bibliography ==
- Gowing, Lawrence. Vermeer. University of California Press; 1 edition 5 December 1997. ISBN 0-520-21276-2.
- Liedtke, Walter. "Vermeer and the Delft School". New York: Metropolitan Museum of Art, 2001. ISBN 0-300-08848-5.
- Wheelock, Arthur. Vermeer. Yale University Press; 1st edition, 25 October 1995. ISBN 0-300-06558-2.
