= Pointillé =

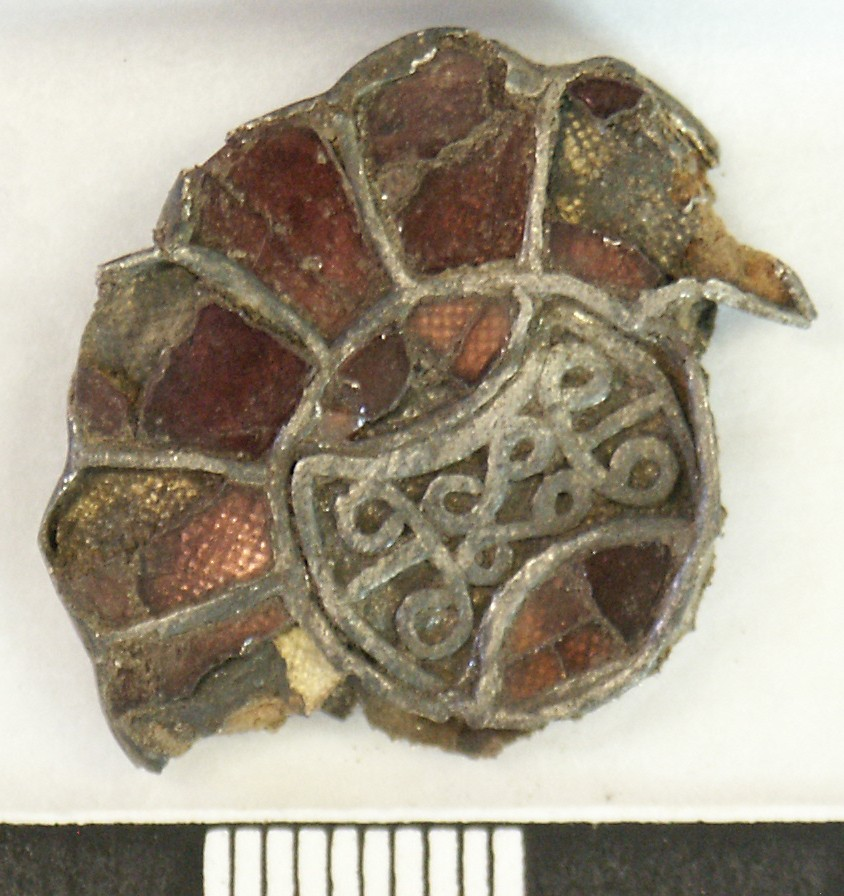
Fragment of a composite silver disc brooch of rosette shape, with inlaid garnets and silver filigree ornament. Six of twelve trapezoidal cells are extant, each with a convex outer edge and set with a cloisonné garnet on pointillé gold foil.

Pointillé is a decorative technique in which patterns are formed on a surface by a means of punched dots. The technique is similar to embossing or engraving but is done manually and does not cut into the surface being decorated. Pointillé was commonly used to decorate arms and armor starting in the fifteenth century. The Holy Thorn Reliquary in the British Museum, made in France at the end of the 14th century, has very fine and delicate pointillé work in gold.

== Common uses ==
Pointillé is commonly used for intricate binding of hand-made book covers in the seventeenth century, the decoration of metallic arms and armor, and for the decoration of hand-finished firearms.
