= Woman with a Water Jug =

1660–1662 painting by Johannes Vermeer

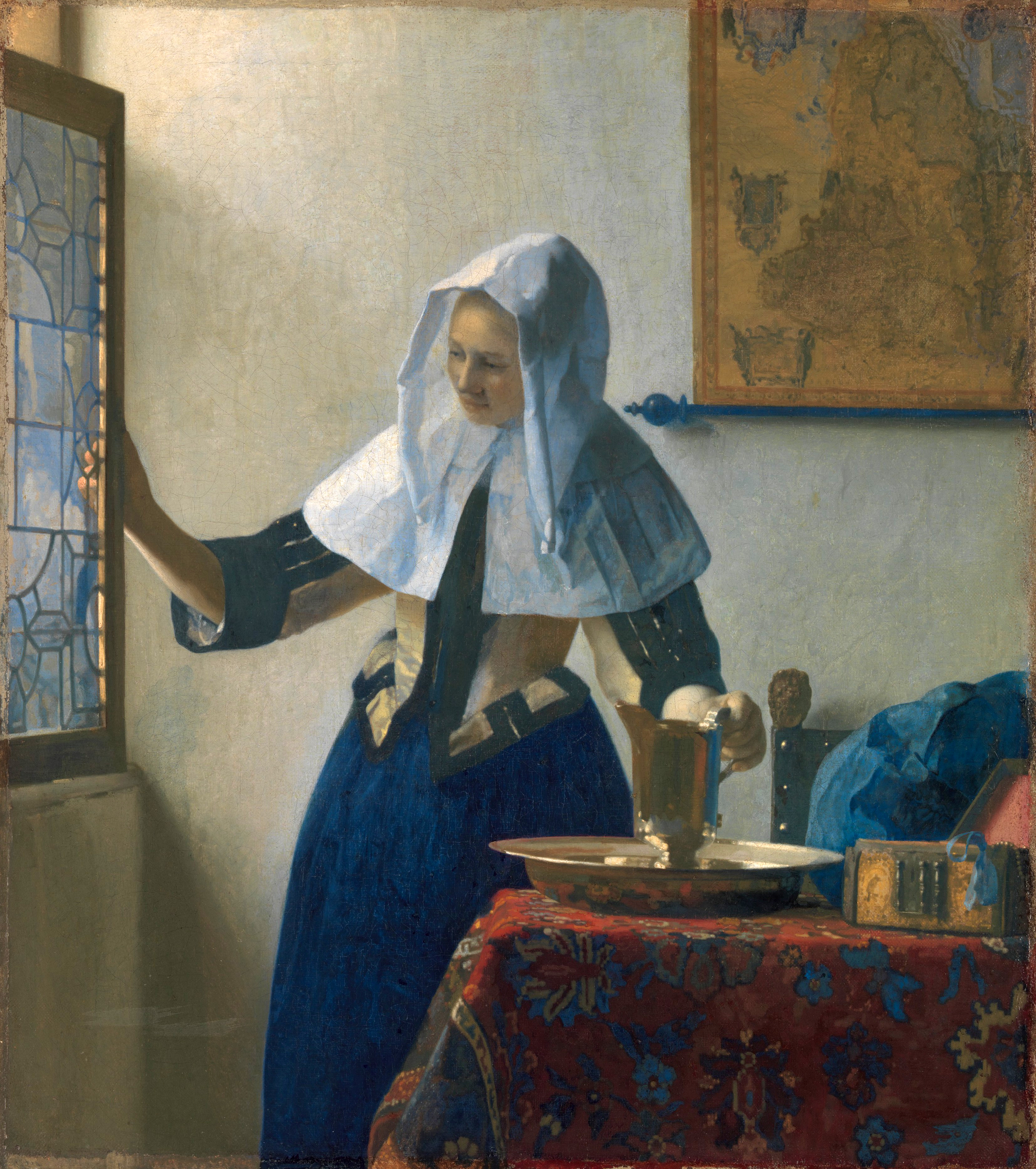
- Artist: Johannes Vermeer
- Year: c. 1660–1662
- Medium: Oil on canvas
- Movement: Dutch Golden Age painting
- Dimensions: 45.7 cm × 40.6 cm (18.0 in × 16.0 in)
- Location: Metropolitan Museum of Art; New York

Woman with a Water Jug (Dutch: Vrouw met waterkan), also known as Young Woman with a Water Pitcher, is a painting finished between 1660–1662 by the Dutch painter Johannes Vermeer in the Baroque style. It is oil on canvas, 45.7cm × 40.6 cm, and is on display at the Metropolitan Museum of Art, New York.

== Description ==
A young woman is found in the center of the picture. She is opening a window with her right hand, while she holds a water jug with her left hand. This jug rests on a larger platter. Both of these, among other objects, are upon on a table. This is decorated with a predominantly red rug of Asian origin. Behind the table stands a chair upon which lies a blue material. The woman gazes out the window. The clothing of the woman consists of a dark blue dress with a black and gold bodice. A white cloth serves as her headpiece. A map hangs in the background on the wall.

This painting is one of a closely related group painted in the early to mid-1660s as the artist was not using linear perspective and geometric order, and the light was his only source of emphasis. The work suggests that Vermeer was aware that light is composed of colours, and the effect of colours on one another. For instance, the blue drape is reflected as dark blue on the side of the metallic pitcher, and the red fabric modifies the gold hue of the basin's underside.

Young Woman with a Water Pitcher was purchased by Henry Gurdon Marquand in 1887 at a Paris gallery for $800. When Marquand brought it to the United States, it was the first Vermeer in America. Marquand donated the artwork along with other pieces in his collection to the Metropolitan Museum of Art in New York City.

== See also ==
- List of paintings by Johannes Vermeer
