= Tarquin and Lucretia (disambiguation) =

Tarquin and Lucretia is a 1571 painting by Titian, now in the Fitzwilliam Museum, Cambridge.

The title Tarquin and Lucretia and variations thereof may also refer to:

- Lucretia and her Husband, a c. 1515 painting by Titian, now in the Kunsthistorisches Museum, Vienna; also titled Tarquin and Lucretia
- The Rape of Lucretia (Ficherelli), several c. 1640 paintings today attributed to Felice Ficherelli; the original is titled Lucretia and Tarquin or Tarquinius and Lucretia
- Lucretia and Tarquin (Luca Giordano), 1663 painting by Luca Giordano; also several other pictures by or after him

== See also ==
- Sextus Tarquinius
- Lucretia
- Lucretia (disambiguation)
- The Rape of Lucretia (disambiguation)
