= Felice Ficherelli =

Italian painter (1605–1660)

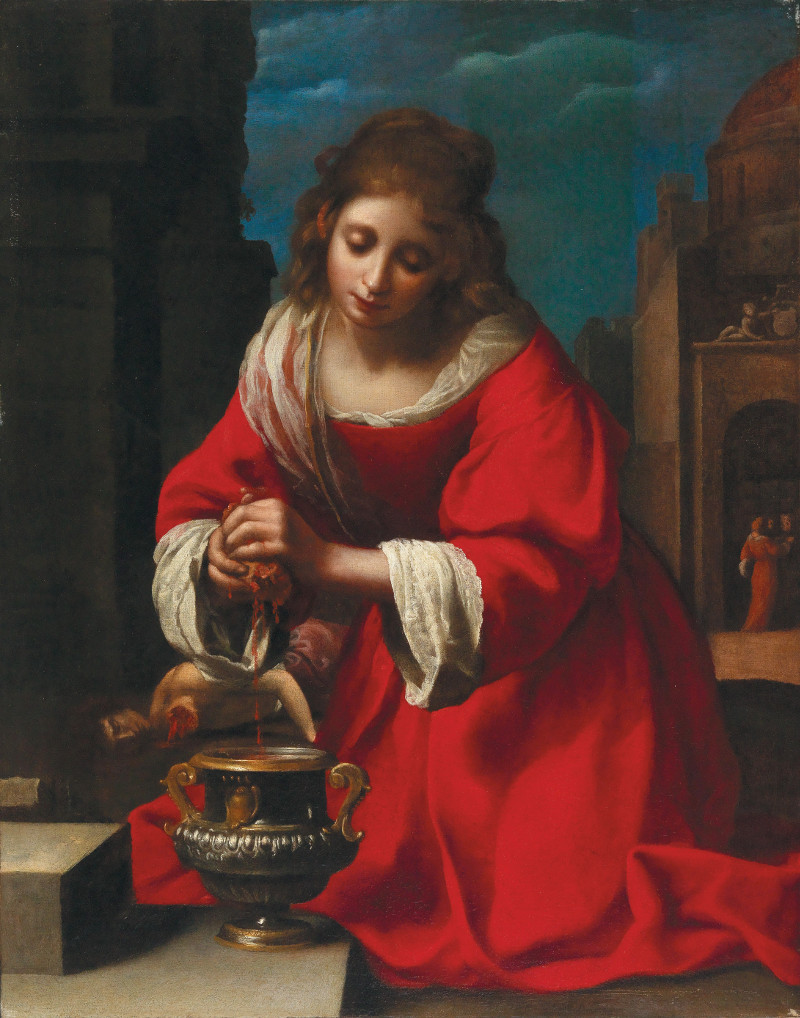
- Saint Praxedis (1640s); The "Bardi-Serzelli" version
- Born: 30 August 1605; San Gimignano, Grand Duchy of Tuscany
- Died: 5 March 1660 (aged 54); Florence, Grand Duchy of Tuscany
- Resting place: Santa Maria Sopr'Arno
- Other name: Il Riposo
- Education: Jacopo da Empoli
- Known for: Painting
- Notable work: Saint Praxedis; The Rape of Lucretia
- Movement: Baroque

Felice Ficherelli (30 August 1605 – 5 March 1660) was an Italian painter of the Baroque period, active mainly in Tuscany. He was nicknamed "Felice Riposo" (Happy I Rest) for his calm and quiet demeanour.

== Biography ==
=== Early career ===
He was born in San Gimignano on 30 August 1603, possibly to a man named Ottaviano. Little is known about his early life. Filippo Baldinucci's biography of Ficherelli, long the primary source for art historians, offers above all anecdotes about his personality. While still very young, Ficherelli moved to Florence, where he found a patron in Count Alberto d'Ottavio Bardi di Vernio, an aide to Cardinal Carlo de Medici. Bardi, an art collector and connoisseur, took Ficherelli into his home and arranged for him to study with the painter Jacopo da Empoli, who played a key role in his artistic development. During this apprenticeship, Ficherelli made copies of works by Florentine Renaissance masters, including Andrea del Sarto’s frescoes in the cloister of the Santissima Annunziata. According to Lanzi, it is precisely this engagement with, and reflection upon, the masters of the past that accounts for the 'exquisite quality of his own paintings'.

Ficherelli's artistic timeline remains difficult to date precisely, as documentary evidence is scarce and the paintings attributed to him are undated and unsigned. In 1629, he matriculated in the Accademia delle Arti del Disegno, where he served as console (consul) in 1652. Despite the death of his patron, Alberto de' Bardi, in 1632, Ficherelli maintained strong connections with the Bardi family. Thanks to a provision in Bardi's will, he was permitted to remain in the Count's home in return for providing one large painting per year. Until recently, several of Ficherelli's works were in the possession of the Bardi family. Among these was Rinaldo and Armida, a large canvas inspired by Tasso's Jerusalem Delivered executed between 1654 and 1655.

Between 1655 and 1656, Ficherelli produced a copy of Pietro Perugino's The Vision of Saint Bernard for the Nasi family Chapel in the church of Santo Spirito, Florence. For the Chapel, he also created two side panels depicting St. Francis and St. Anthony of Padua. The altarpiece in the Church of Sant'Egidio in the Hospital of Santa Maria Nuova, which depicts the Virgin presenting the Christ Child to St. Anthony accompanied by St. Francis and St. Nicholas, can be dated to the period between 1654 and 1657 when Ludovico Serristori served as the hospital's director.

=== Mature work ===
Baldinucci records that around 1655, Ficherelli painted a St. Cecilia for the Church of San Giovanni Battista, Livorno. Between January 1657 and the summer of 1659, the artist worked at the Florence Charterhouse, painting a St. Anthony of Padua (untraced) and a Madonna Appearing to St. Philip Neri (in situ) for the two altars in the coro dei conversi. The majority of Ficherelli's work consisted of paintings intended for private patrons, covering both secular and sacred subjects. Critics have emphasised that the first phase of Ficherelli's career, beginning in the 1630s, was characterised by influences from Jacopo da Empoli and a close affinity with the soft style of his contemporaries Francesco Furini and Cecco Bravo. Works from this period include the Sacrifice of Isaac (Florence, priv. col.), Jael and Sisera (Florence, Uffizi), Judith and Holofernes (Florence, priv. col.), St. Agatha (once belonging to Francesco Redi; Dijon, Musée Magnin) and an expanded version of the latter: the Martyrdom of St. Agatha (Florence, priv. col.).

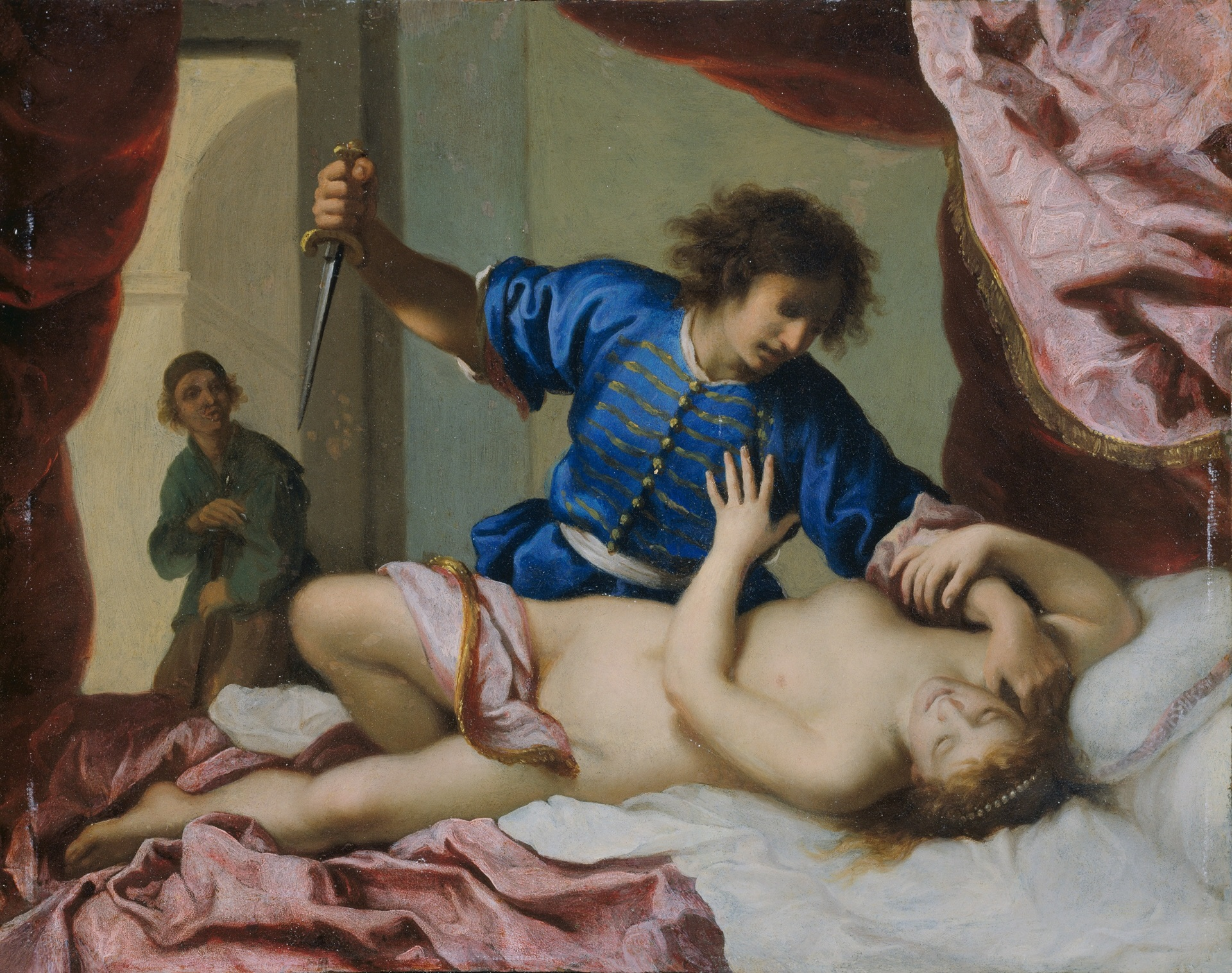
The Rape of Lucretia, c. 1640, Wallace Collection, London

Many of Ficherelli’s paintings demonstrate his penchant for highly dramatic, sometimes violent, scenes. Set within a pronounced chiaroscuro atmosphere, these scenes feature illuminated figures emerging from deep shadows. The softness of the brushwork creates a sense of ambiguity, a quality frequently highlighted by art historians. Several works dating to the transition between the 1630s and 1640s are particularly significant in this regard. Notable examples include Tarquin and Lucretia, (Rome, Accademia di San Luca), and Julia Receiving the Bloodstained Garments of Pompey (Genoa, priv. col.). To this period also dates Ficherelli's most famous work, Saint Praxedis, which exists in two versions. A copy of the later version is signed by Johannes Vermeer and dated 1655, which would make it one of his earliest works. The painting perfectly captures the sense of piety that permeates even Ficherelli’s more 'bloody' compositions.

=== Later works ===
Towards the end of the 1640s, Ficherelli abandoned the sensual refinement characteristic of Furini's style in favour of increasingly loose and unrefined brushwork, and a palette that was no longer bright or enamel-like. This shift heightened the sense of unease in his figures' expressions. This pessimistic and tragic interpretation of the Baroque was also evident in the work of other Florentine painters, including Cecco Bravo during his final period. Examples include works such as the Allegory of Patience (Florence, priv. col.), Artemisia (Florence, priv. col.), and Sophonisba Taking Poison.

From the mid-1650s, Ficherelli's paintings entered a new phase, characterised by the artist's move towards more 'conventional' styles, marked by a certain classicising aspiration. Examples include the Lot and His Daughters (Dublin National Gallery of Ireland), a version of St. Cecilia (Florence, priv. col.) and the octagonal David with the Head of Goliath (Florence, priv. col.), which, according to Baldinucci, was the artist's last work. Ficherelli died in Florence on 5 March 1660 and was buried in the church of Santa Maria Sopr'Arno. The church was demolished in 1869 to widen the Lungarno.

== Selected Works ==
Judith with the Head of Holofernes (c. 1665), Art Institute of Chicago

- St. Agatha, oil on canvas, Cassa di Risparmio, Pistoia;
- St. Lawrence, Nationalmuseum, Stockholm;
- Jonah emerges from the belly of the whale, Musée des Beaux-Arts de Chambéry;
- The Vision of St. Philip Neri, Florence Charterhouse;
- Jael Killing Sisera, oil on canvas, 121 × 155 cm, Palazzo Pitti, Florence;
- The Sacrifice of Isaac, oil on canvas, Museum of Fine Arts, Budapest;
- St. Agatha, Musée Magnin, Dijon;
- St. Sebastian, Slovak National Gallery, Bratislava;
- The Rape of Lucretia (late 1630s), Wallace Collection, London;
- Antiochus Prince of Syria and Stratonica His Stepmother, (c. 1638), Auckland Art Gallery;
- The Rape of Lucretia (c. 1640), Ca' Rezzonico, Venice;
- Tarquin and Lucretia (c. 1640), oil on canvas, Museum of Fine Arts, Budapest;
- The Death of Cleopatra (1650), oil on canvas, National Gallery of Slovenia, Ljubljana;
- Lot and His Daughters (mid-1650s), Dublin National Gallery of Ireland;
- Judith with the Head of Holofernes (c. 1665), Art Institute of Chicago.
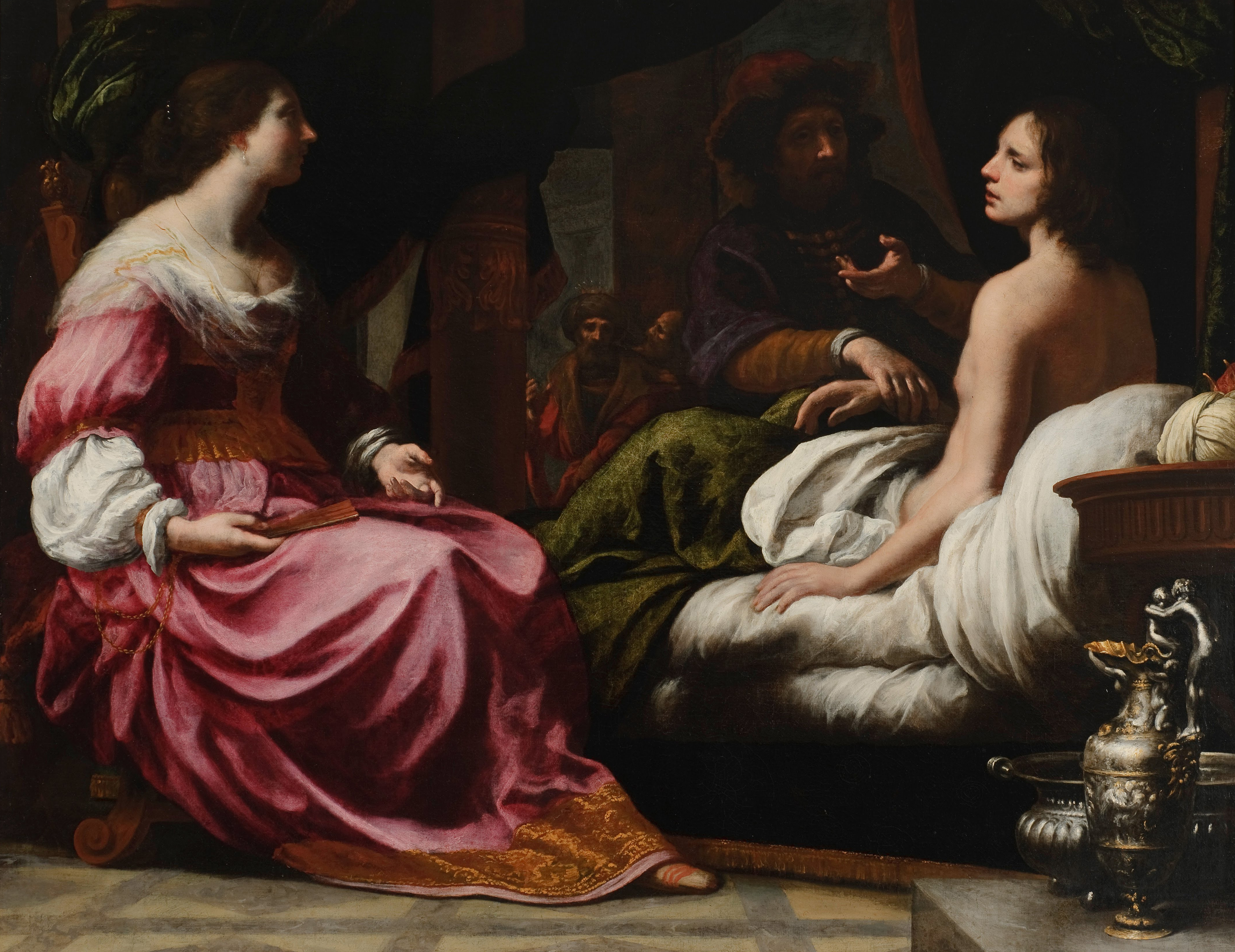
Antiochus Prince of Syria and Stratonica His Stepmother (c. 1638), Auckland Art Gallery

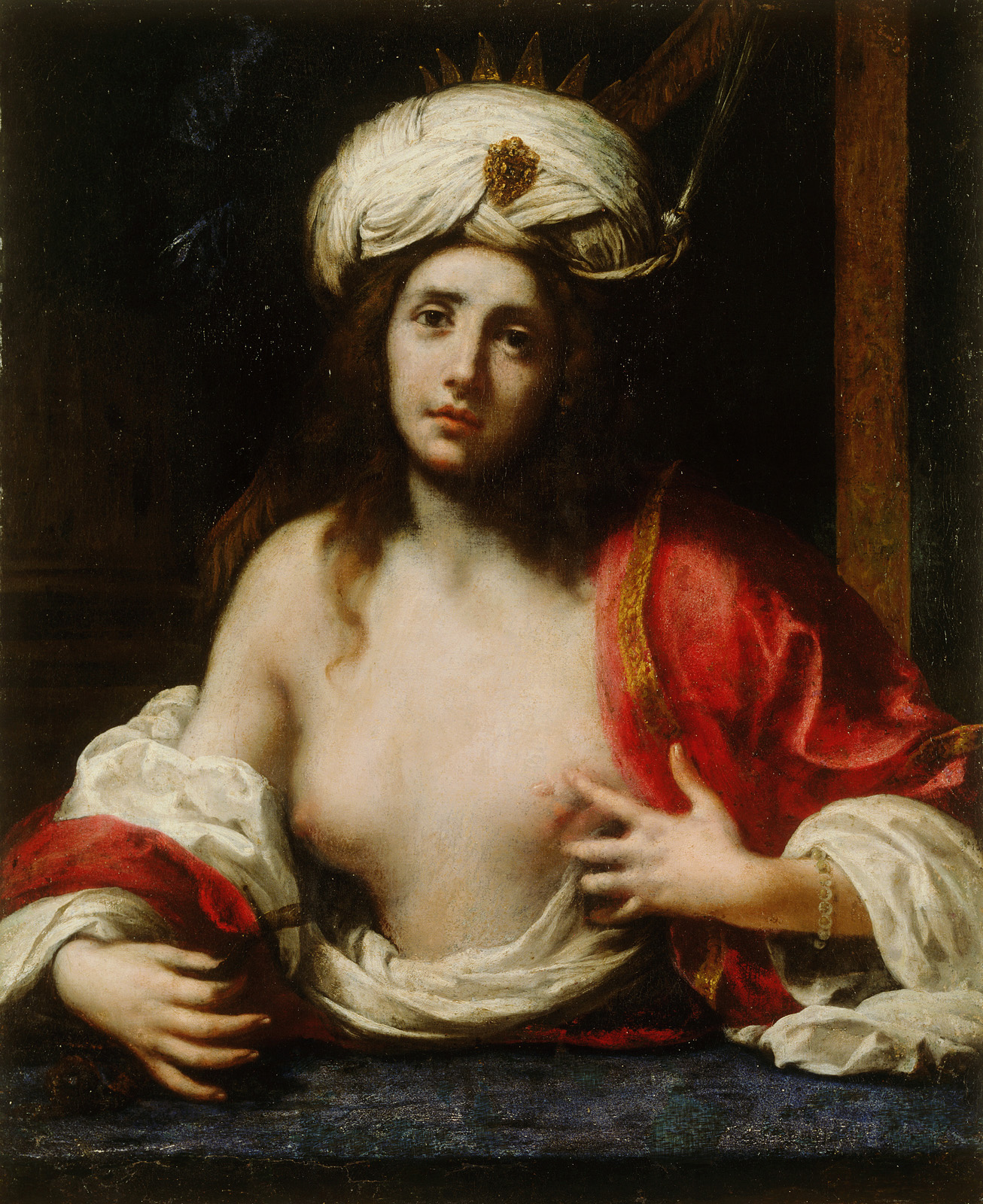
The Death of Cleopatra (1650), oil on canvas, National Gallery of Slovenia, Ljubljana

Jonah emerges from the belly of the whale, Musée des Beaux-Arts de Chambéry

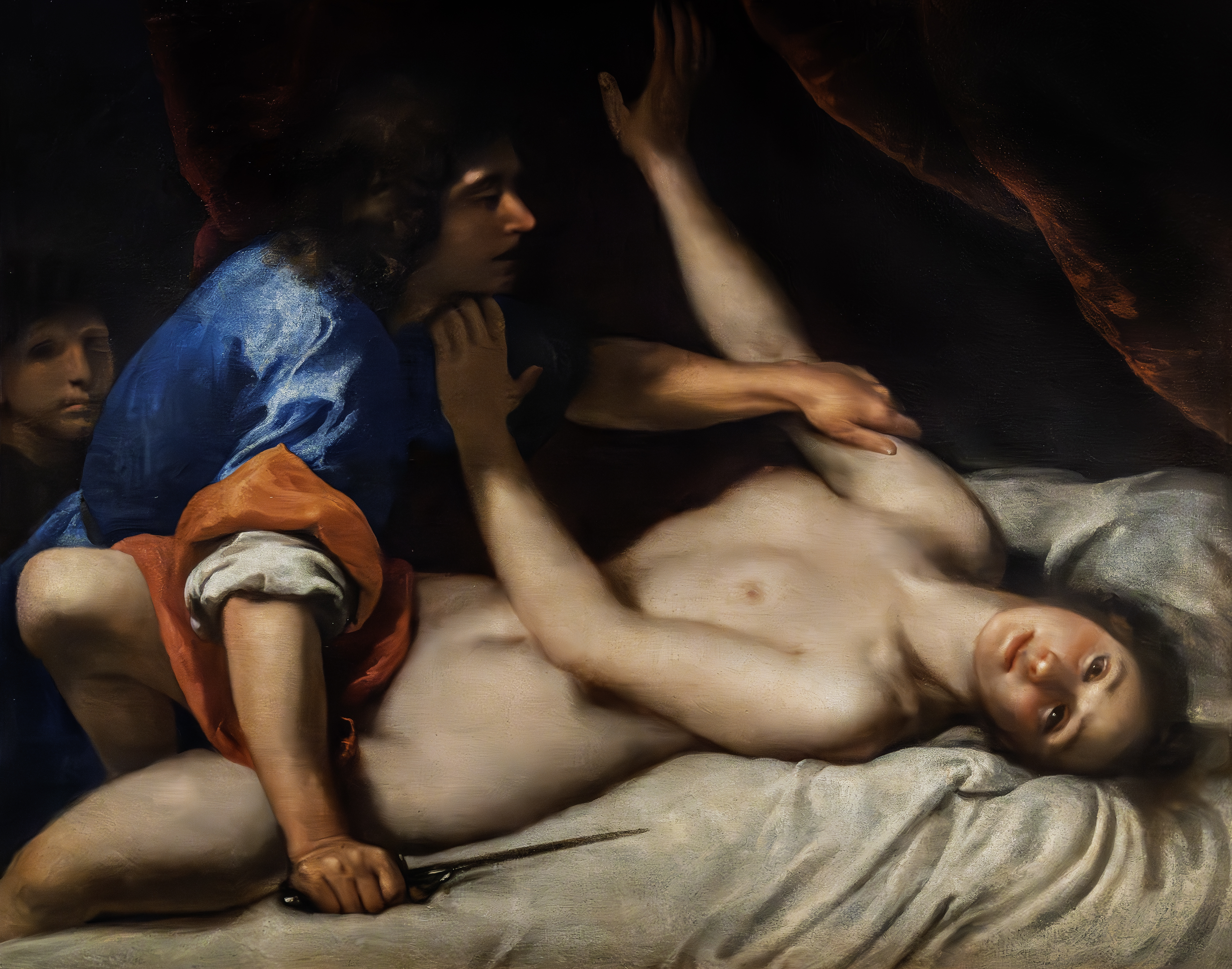
The Rape of Lucretia (c. 1640), Ca' Rezzonico, Venice

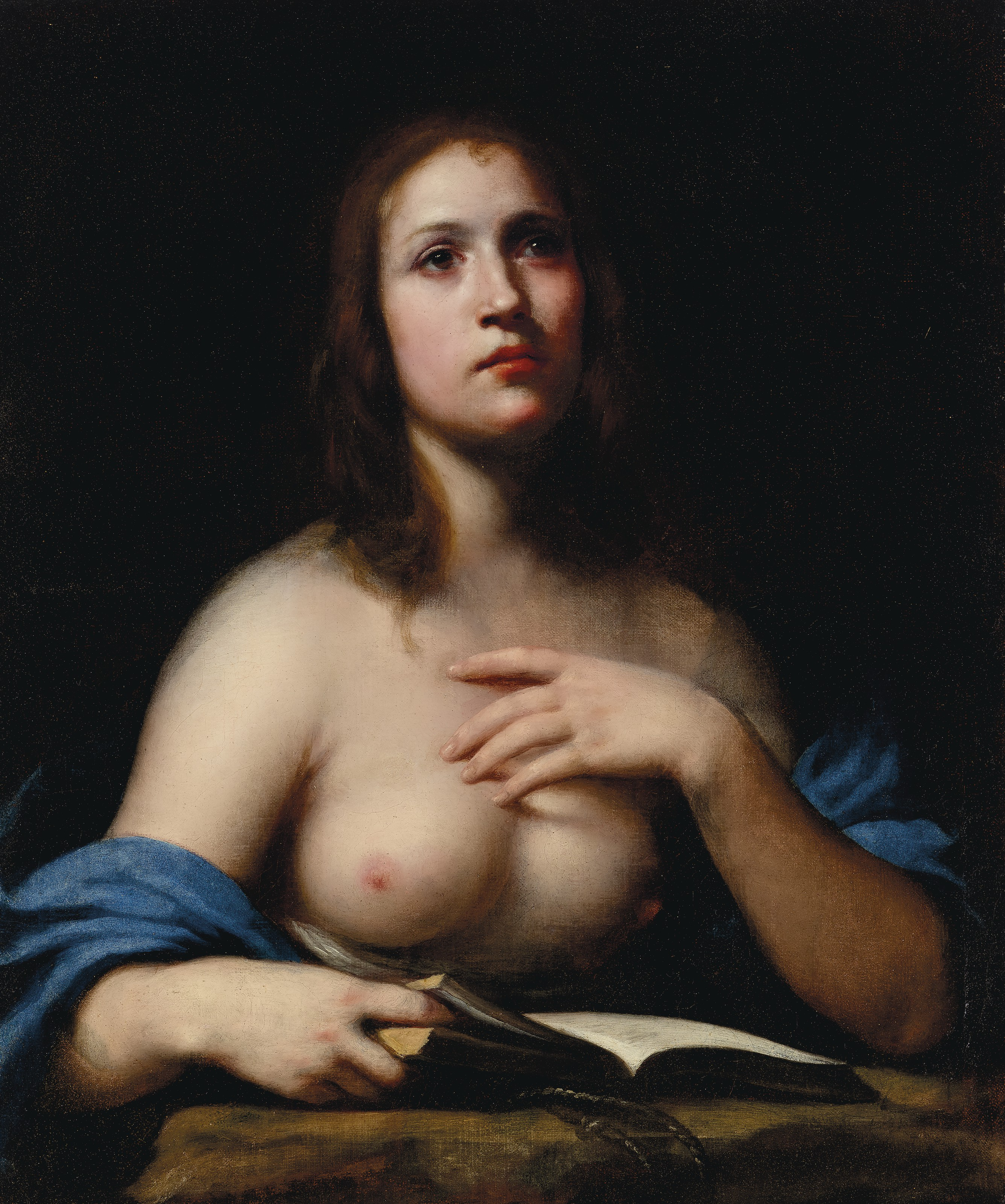
The Penitent Magdalene, priv. col.

The Martyrdom of St. Agatha, priv. col.

Samson captured by the Philistines, Palatine Gallery, Palazzo Pitti, Florence

Jael Killing Sisera, Palatine Gallery, Palazzo Pitti, Florence

== Bibliography ==
- Baldinucci, Filippo (1846). Ferdinando Ranalli (ed.). Notizie de' Professori del Disegno (in Italian). Vol. III. Florence: V. Batelli. pp. 563–574.
- Gregori, Mina (1965). 70 pitture e sculture del '600 e '700 fiorentino (in Italian). Florence: Vallecchi.
- Nissman, Joan Lee; Hibbard, Howard (1969). Florentine Baroque Art from the American Collections. New York: Metropolitan Museum of Art.
- Leoncini, Giovanni (1997). "FICHERELLI, Felice". Dizionario Biografico degli Italiani (in Italian). Vol. 47: Ferrero–Filonardi. Rome: Institute of the Italian Encyclopaedia. ISBN 978-88-12-00032-6.
- Acanfora, Elisa (2003). "Ficherelli, Felice [il Riposo]". Grove Art Online. Oxford: Oxford University Press. doi:10.1093/gao/9781884446054.article.T028158.
