= Saint Praxedis (painting) =

Painting attributed to Johannes Vermeer

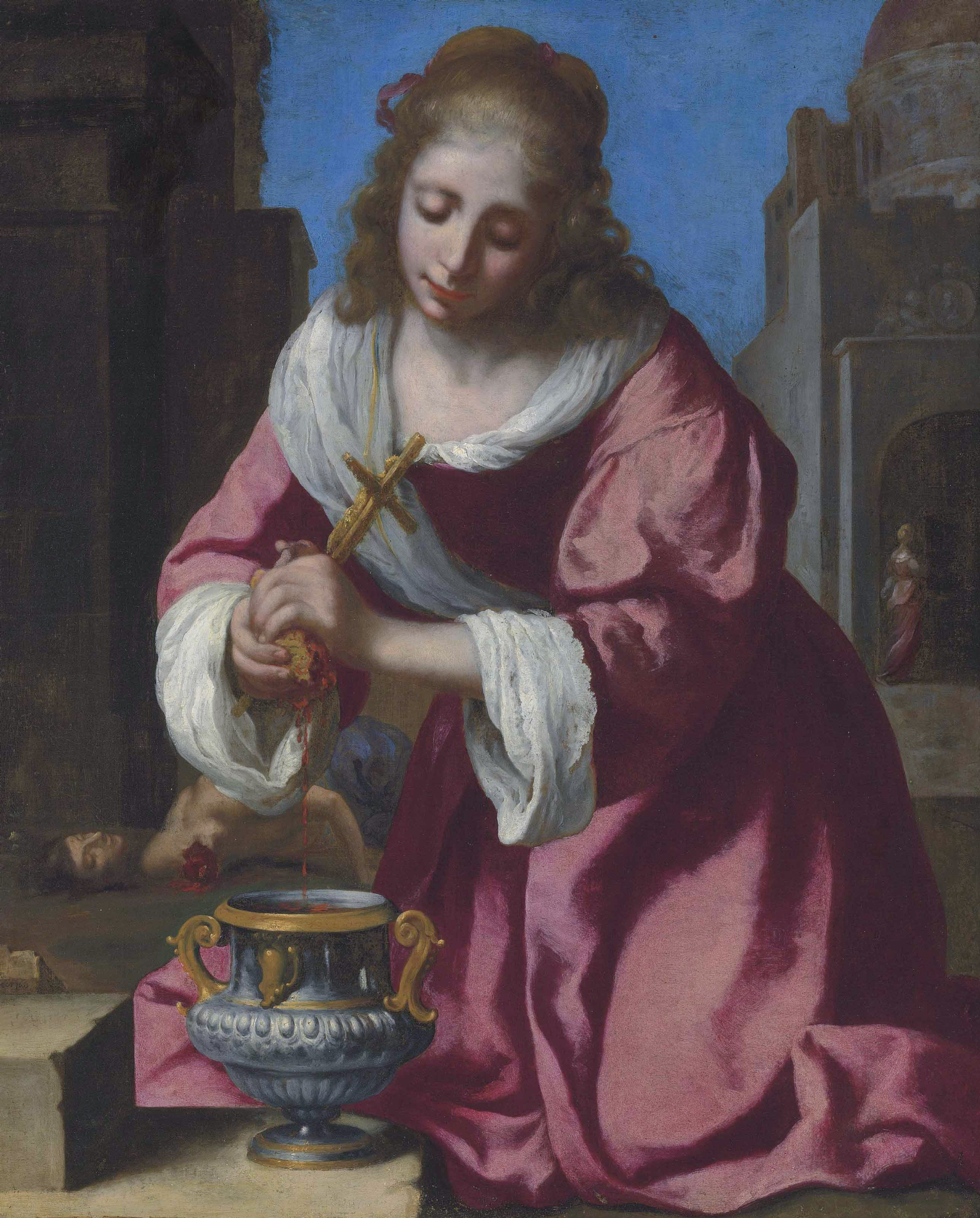
- Artist: Johannes Vermeer
- Year: c. 1655
- Medium: Oil on canvas
- Dimensions: 102 cm × 83 cm (40 in × 33 in)
- Location: Kufu Company, Inc. On loan to the National Museum of Western Art, Tokyo

Saint Praxedis is an oil painting by Johannes Vermeer. This attribution has often been questioned. The painting is believed to be a copy of a work by Felice Ficherelli that depicts the early Roman martyr, Saint Praxedis or Praxedes.

In 2014, the auction house Christie's announced that their investigations had established it to be a work by Vermeer. Before a 2023 exhibition of Vermeer's work at the Rijksmuseum, the museum announced it had confirmed the attribution to Vermeer. The painting is believed to be one of Vermeer's earliest surviving works, created in 1655.

== Description and date ==
The painting depicts the saint squeezing a martyr's blood from a sponge into an ornate vessel. It is closely related to a work by Ficherelli from 1640 to 1645, now in the Collection Fergnani in Ferrara, and is generally assumed to be a copy of it (though see below for an alternative interpretation). The most obvious difference between the two is that there is no crucifix in the Ferrara work. It is Vermeer's only known close copy of another work.

This is one of only four dated Vermeer paintings, the others being The Procuress (1656), The Astronomer (1668) and The Geographer (1669). Vermeer's two early history paintings, Christ in the House of Martha and Mary and Diana and Her Companions, are dated by almost all art historians to 1654–6, although opinions differ as to which is earlier.

== Provenance and 2014 sale ==
The painting's provenance before the mid-twentieth century is unknown. The collector Jacob Reder bought it at a minor auction house in New York in 1943. It first received significant attention as a possible Vermeer when being shown as a part of an exhibition of Florentine Baroque art at the Metropolitan Museum of Art in New York in 1969. The exhibition catalogue drew attention to the signature "Meer 1655" and Michael Kitson, reviewing the exhibition, suggested it could be a genuine Vermeer on the basis of stylistic similarities to Diana and Her Companions. Following Reder's death (also in 1969) it was bought by the art dealer Spencer A. Samuels, who also believed it to be by Vermeer. The Barbara Piasecka Johnson Collection Foundation bought it from Spencer in 1987. The leading Vermeer scholar Arthur K. Wheelock Jr. subsequently argued the case for the attribution to Vermeer in an article devoted to it in 1986.

The painting was not included in the exhibition "The Young Vermeer" held in The Hague, Dresden and Edinburgh in 2010–11. However it was included in an exhibition of Vermeer's work held in Rome in 2012–13, curated by Wheelock, Liedtke, and Sandrina Bandera.

It was sold at Christie's in London on 8 July 2014 on behalf of the Barbara Piasecka Johnson Collection Foundation. It sold to an unknown buyer for £6,242,500 (US$10,687,160), at the lower end of the estimated price range of £6-£8 million. Some art market commentators speculated that doubt about the attribution to Vermeer may have contributed to the relatively low price. From March 2015 it has been on display in the National Museum of Western Art in Tokyo, labelled as "attributed to Johannes Vermeer". This appears to be a long-term loan to the museum from a private collector.

In a 2023 exhibition catalogue, the Rijksmuseum revealed that Kufu Company, Inc. has owned the painting since 2014.

== Debates over attribution ==
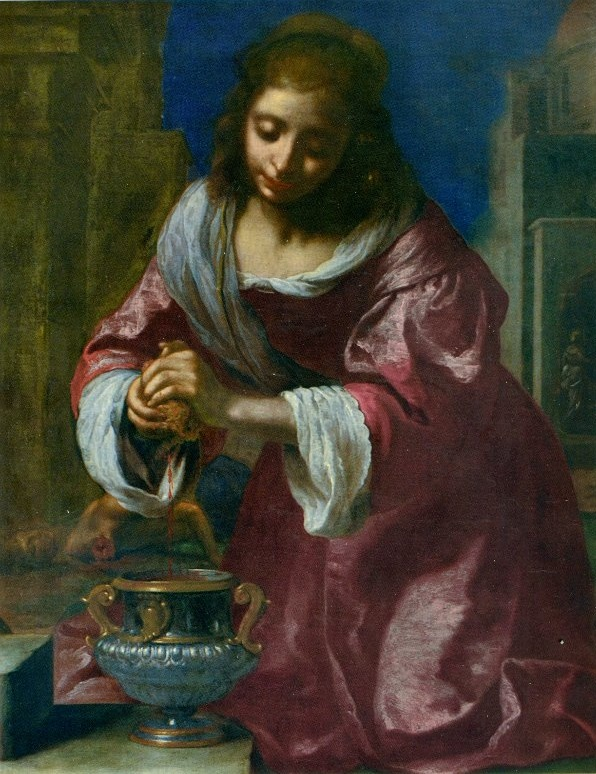
Ficherelli's original

The painting may have two signatures. The more obvious of the two reads "Meer 1655", while the second appears as "Meer N R o o". It is possible that this second signature originally read "Meer naar Riposo", or "Vermeer after Riposo": Riposo was Ficherelli's nickname. The Doerner Institute's examination of the signatures concluded that both signatures were original and composed of pigments typical of the painting. Wheelock's examination also led him to conclude that both signatures were original, and recent technical examination has demonstrated that the clearer signature is likely to have been added at, or close to, the date the painting was created. However, these new investigations agreed with the earlier opinion of the conservator Jørgen Wadum that the possible second signature is too indistinct to be deciphered.

An analysis of the lead white paint, performed by the Rijksmuseum in 2014 in association with the Vrije Universiteit Amsterdam, suggests Dutch or Flemish origin with a strong possibility that the pigment was related to paint used in Vermeer's Diana and Her Companions. The use of a chalk ground is associated with Dutch paintings of this era and the work reflects an unusually extensive use of ultramarine, typical of Vermeer's later work, but not of his earlier paintings, Diana and Her Companions or Christ in the House of Martha and Mary. Wheelock identified stylistic similarities with two history paintings that scholars have confidently attributed to Vermeer. He also noted similarities between the depiction of the saint's face and the figure in Vermeer's A Girl Asleep and argued that the painter's conversion to Catholicism could have given him an interest in the subject matter. Although it is thought unlikely that the Ferrara painting left Italy or that Vermeer visited Italy, Wheelock pointed out that Vermeer had a reputation as an authority on Italian art. It is possible that another version or copy of the Ferrara painting was the model for Vermeer's work.

In 1998, Wadum argued that the painting was not a copy of the work in Ferrara, or of any other work, because the background elements were painted before the foreground, which is typical of an original work rather than a copy. In 2014, Christie's suggested that this could reflect experimentation by Vermeer, a young artist modeling and adapting techniques in the original.

In advance of a 2023 exhibition at the Rijksmuseum, Saint Praxedis was one of three disputed works of art in Vermeer's oeuvre that the museum "upgraded" and deemed to be authentic works by the artist.

== See also ==
- List of paintings by Johannes Vermeer
