= San Giovanni Battista, Livorno =

Church in Livorno, Tuscany, Italy

Coordinates: 43.5520°N 10.3068°E

San Giovanni Battista is a Baroque-Mannerist style, Roman Catholic church located at the crossing of Via San Giovanni and Via Carraia in central Livorno, region of Tuscany, Italy.

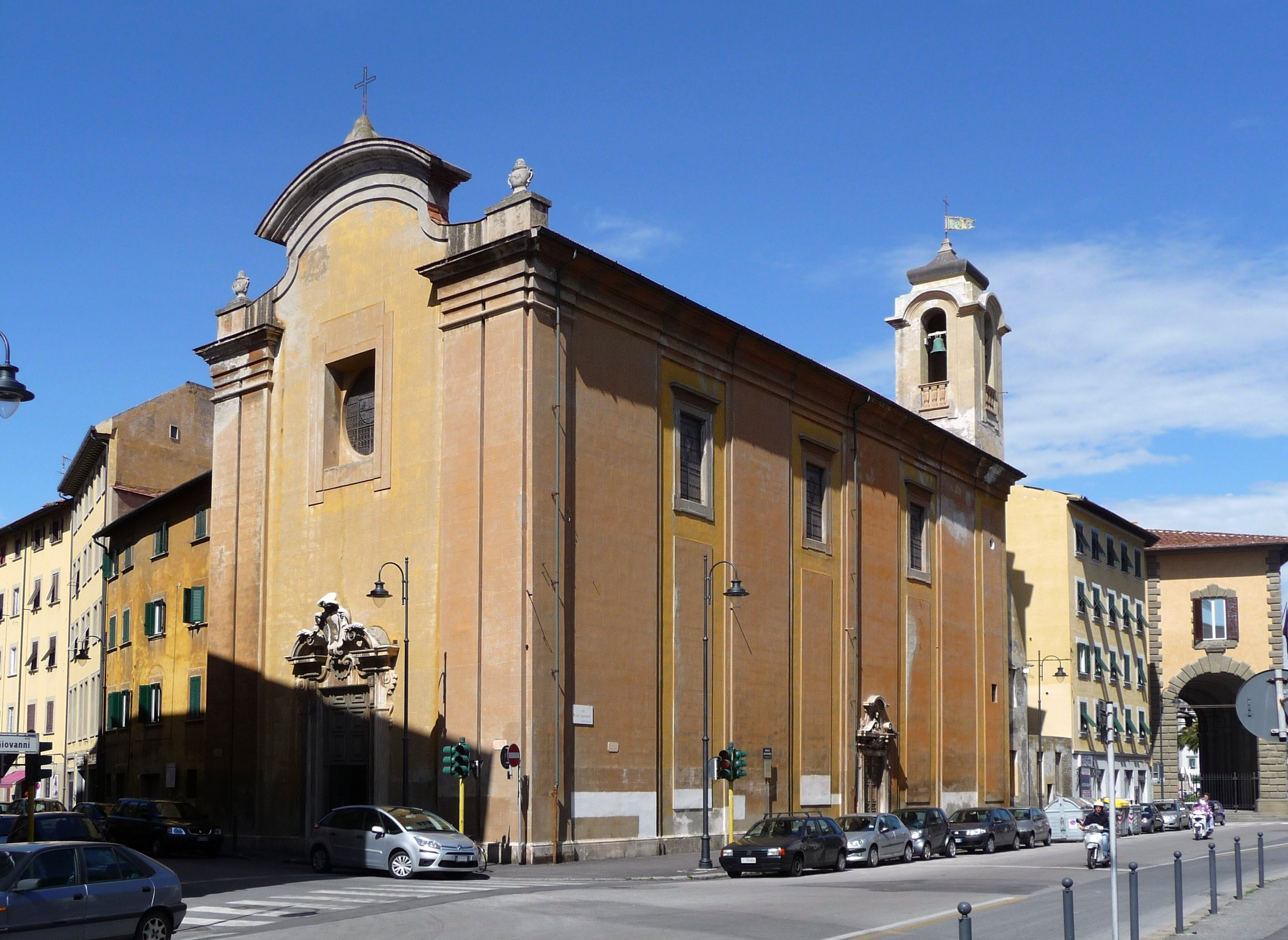
Church including facade with mannerist elements

== History ==
A church or oratory is cited to be present at the site since the 13th century, when it was staffed by Augustinian priests from the nearby ancient convent of San Jacopo di Aquaviva. The original oratory may be the same as one once dedicated to St Anthony Abbot. The church we see today is mainly due to a 1624 reconstruction using designs of Giovanni Francesco Cantagallina, brother of Remigio. The church facade awkwardly rises, tall and narrow, and is peppered with Mannerist, often contradictory, touches such as a rounded tympanum, a rectangular, scroll-like frame for an oval oculus. The marble portal is ornate, yet the facade is otherwise sober in its pilasters. The nave windows loom awkwardly on the flanks, and a second elegant portal is placed on the flank. The church was damaged again by earthquakes in 1742 and 1814, and underwent repairs in 1833. The Augustinian monks were expelled by Granduke Pietro Leopoldo in 1785, but they were allowed to return in 1856.

== Interior decoration ==
Beside the main altar is a canvas of St Joseph and the Lactating Madonna with infant, transferred here from the suppressed church of the Purification of Mary; two other canvases on the lateral walls depict the Martyrdom of St Bartholemew, by Francesco Bianchi Buonavita and St Cajetan, attributed to Matteo Rosselli. Tommaso Tommasi painted the Life of St Augustine in the ceiling. The first altar to the right of the main door is dedicated to Saints Crespino and Crespiniano and a canvas attributed to school of Domenico Passignano. The second altar on the right has a venerated ancient wooden crucifix, called dell' agonia, used until 1820 during Holy Friday processions. The crucifix was brought here in the early 1800s from the Sant'Antonio hospital.

Over the lateral door a canvas, depicts St Agnes with words: Mecum habeo angelum Domini, the painting is attributed to Felice Ficherelli. The main altar was completed with marbles and pietra dura by Ferdinando Tacca (son of Pietro), a commission ordered by Lodovico da Verrazzano, governor of Livorno, whose heraldic symbol includes a red star. The choir has a wooden statue of St Sebastian Martyr by the 15th-century Florentine School. Next to the pulpit, is the altar dedicated to the Madonna della Cintura and San Niccola da Tolentino. These canvases and the Deposition from the Cross, recall works of Cigoli.

The area suffered damage during the second world war bombardments.
