= The Rape of Lucretia (disambiguation) =

The Rape of Lucretia is a two-act opera by Benjamin Britten, first performed in 1946.

The Rape of Lucretia may also refer to:

- Lucretia (late 6th century BC), legendary Roman noblewoman, the subject of Britten's opera
- The Rape of Lucretia (Ficherelli), several c. late 1630s paintings attributed to Felice Ficherelli
- The Rape of Lucrece, a 1594 narrative poem by William Shakespeare
- The Rape of Lucrece, a 1608 play by Thomas Heywood
