= Lucretia and Tarquin (Luca Giordano) =

1663 oil painting by Luca Giordano

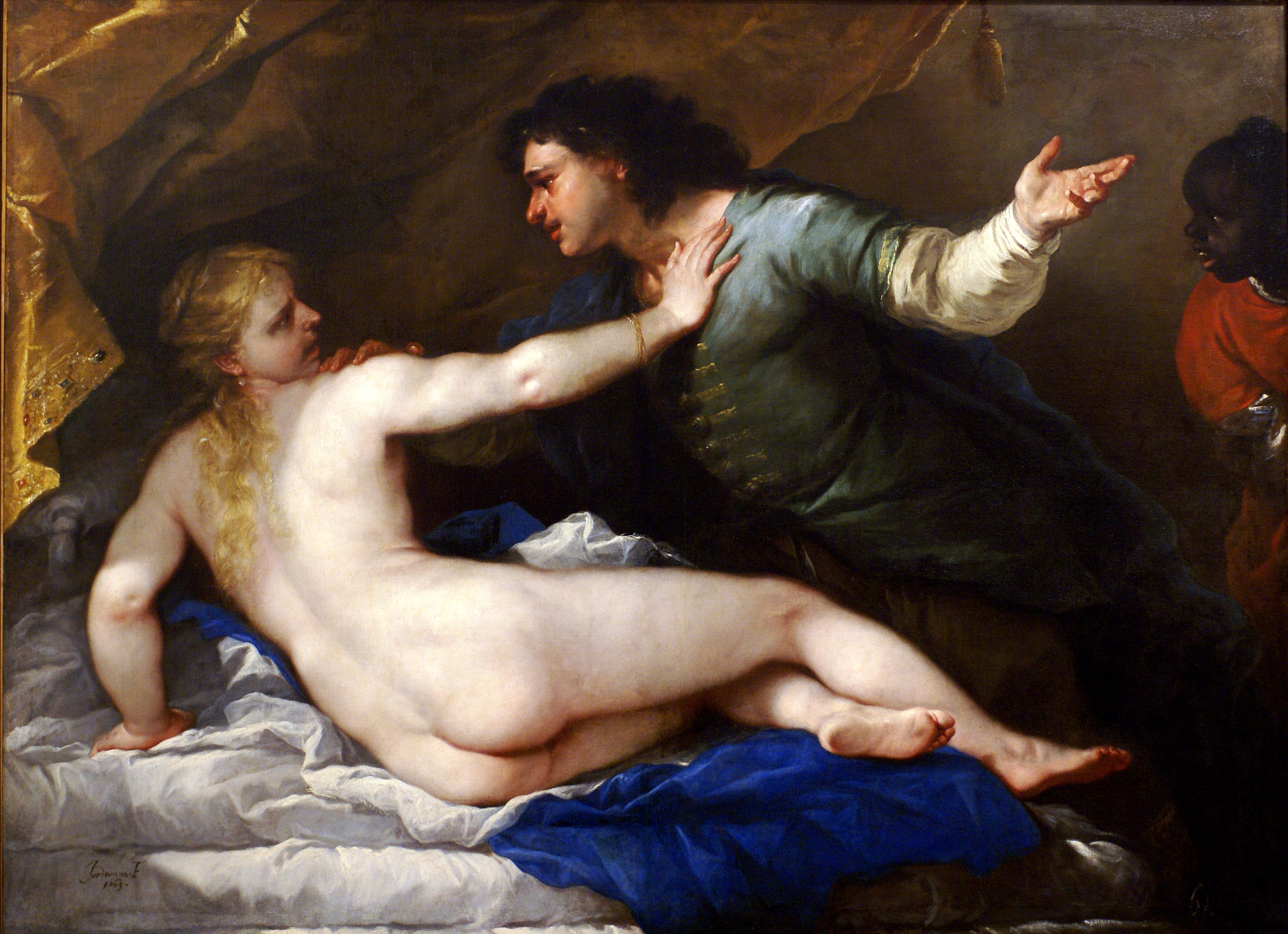
Lucretia and Tarquin, 1663

Lucretia and Tarquin (Italian: Lucrezia e Tarquinio) is a 1663 oil painting by the Italian Baroque artist Luca Giordano of the legendary rape of Lucretia by Sextus Tarquin, as told by Livy and Ovid. It is now in the Museo di Capodimonte in Naples (Inv. Q 1678).

== History ==
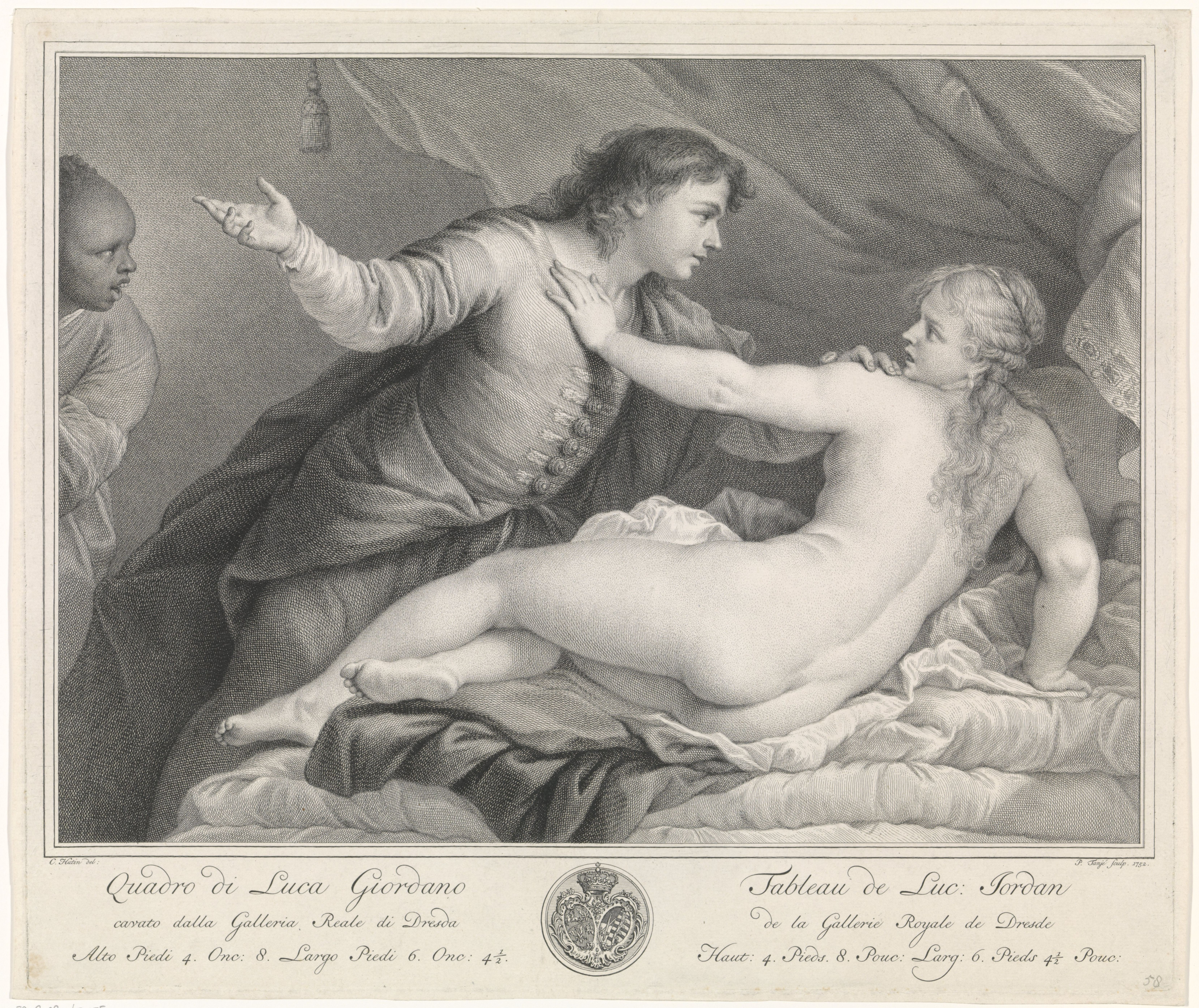
Engraving by P. Tanjé

The picture was part of the 1862 bequest of Alfonso d'Avalos, 13th Marquis of Vasto (1796–1862), who left his family art collection to the National Museum of Naples. This or a very similar picture was apparently once in the Dresden Gallery, and was engraved as such by Pieter Tanjé.

== Description ==
A blonde Lucretia, nude, upon a couch or bed, her back to the viewer; Tarquin has one hand upon her shoulder, and points with the other to a black servant beyond. The canvas is signed and dated 1663 and measures 160 x 83 cm.

== Related works ==
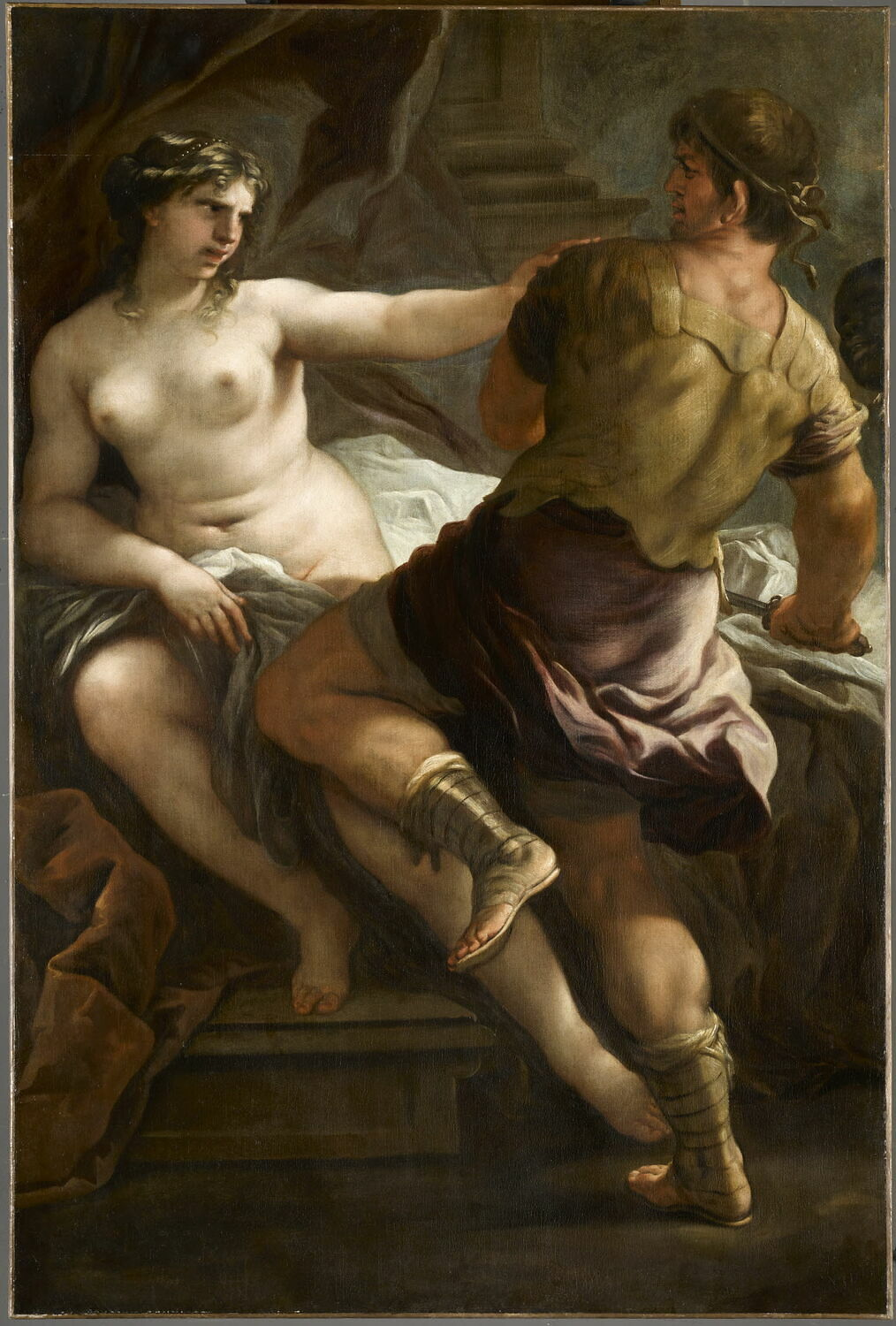
Picture in the Louvre (storage)

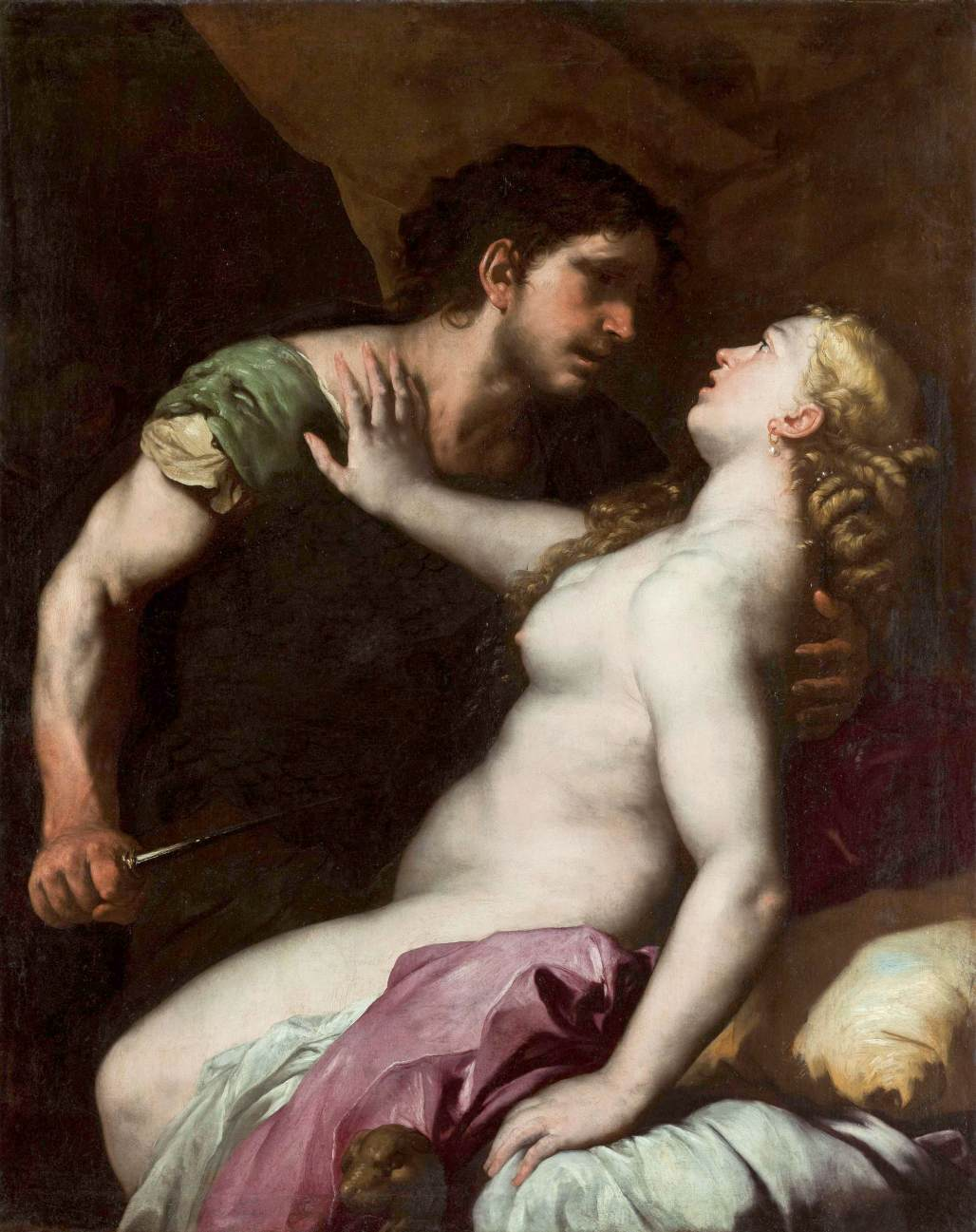
Picture in a private collection

There is a quite different picture in the storage of the Louvre, catalogued as Lucretia and Tarquin (French: Lucrèce et Tarquin), dated to the first quarter of the 17th century and attributed to the workshop of Giordano. This picture was once part of the art collection of Louis La Caze (1798–1869), which he bequeathed to the Louvre. Another picture by Luca Giordano on this subject is in a private collection.

== See also ==
- List of works by Luca Giordano
- Tarquin and Lucretia (Titian)
- The Rape of Lucretia (Ficherelli)
- Lucretia (Artemisia Gentileschi, Potsdam)

== Sources ==
- Champlin, John Denison Jr.; Perkins, Charles C., eds. (1887). "Lucretia and Tarquin". Cyclopedia of Painters and Paintings. Vol. 3. New York: Charles Scribner's Sons. p. 110.
- Spinosa, Nicola, ed. (1996). The National Museum of Capodimonte. Guide Artistiche Electa Napoli. Italy. p. 134.
- Woermann, Karl (1908). Katalog der Königlichen Gemäldegalerie zu Dresden (in German). Dresden: Kunstanstalt Wilhelm Hoffmann. p. 176, no. 486.
- Recueil d'estampes d'apres les plus celebres tableaux de la Galerie Royale de Dresde. Dresden. 1753. p. xxxvii.
