= Diana and Her Companions =

Painting by Johannes Vermeer c. 1653–1656

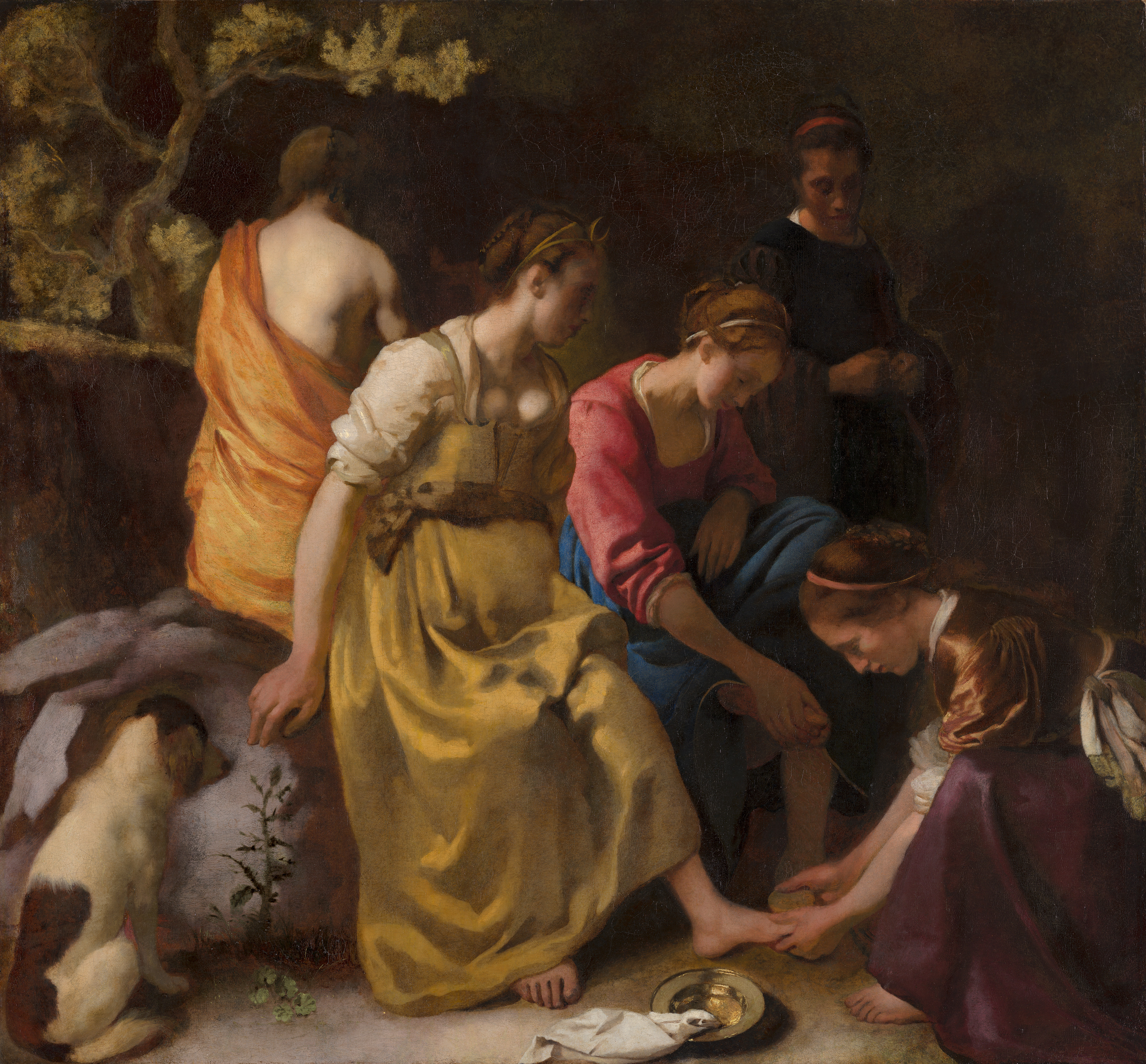
- Artist: Johannes Vermeer
- Year: 1655–1656 or c. 1653–1654
- Medium: Oil on canvas
- Movement: Dutch Golden Age painting
- Dimensions: 98.5 cm × 105 cm (38.8 in × 41 in)
- Location: Mauritshuis, The Hague

Diana and Her Companions (Dutch: Diana en haar Nimfen or Diana en haar gezellinnen) is a painting by Dutch artist Johannes Vermeer completed in the early to mid-1650s, now at the Mauritshuis museum in The Hague. Although the exact year is unknown, the work may be the artisit's earliest surviving painting, with some art historians placing it before Christ in the House of Martha and Mary and some after.

The painting's solemn mood is unusual for a scene depicting the goddess Diana, and the nymph washing the central figure's feet has captured the attention of critics and historians, both for her activity and contemporary clothing. Rather than directly illustrating one of the dramatic moments in well-known episodes from myths about Diana, the scene shows a woman and her attendants quietly at her toilette. The theme of a woman in a private, reflective moment would grow stronger in Vermeer's paintings as his career progressed.

Nothing of the work's history before the mid-19th century is known, and the painting was not widely accepted as one of Vermeer's until the early 20th century, when its similarities with Mary and Martha were noticed. About one ninth of the painting's width has been removed from the right side, and it was not discovered until 1999 or 2000 that the sky in the upper right-hand corner had been added in the 19th century.

== Description ==
=== The scene ===
The painting depicts the Greek and Roman goddess Diana ("Artemis" in Ancient Greece) with four of her companions. She wears a loose fitting, yellow dress with an animal-skin sash and, on her head, a diadem with a symbol of the crescent moon. As she sits on a rock, a nymph washes her left foot. Another, behind Diana, sits with her partially bare back to the viewer (the most skin Vermeer shows on a figure in any of his extant paintings), a third nymph, sitting at Diana's left, holds her own left foot with her right hand. A fourth stands in the rear, somewhat apart from the rest of the group and facing them and the viewer at an angle, her eyes cast down, her fists in front of her. A dog sits in the lower left-hand corner near Diana, its back to the viewer as it faces the goddess, her attendants and, immediately in front of it, a thistle.

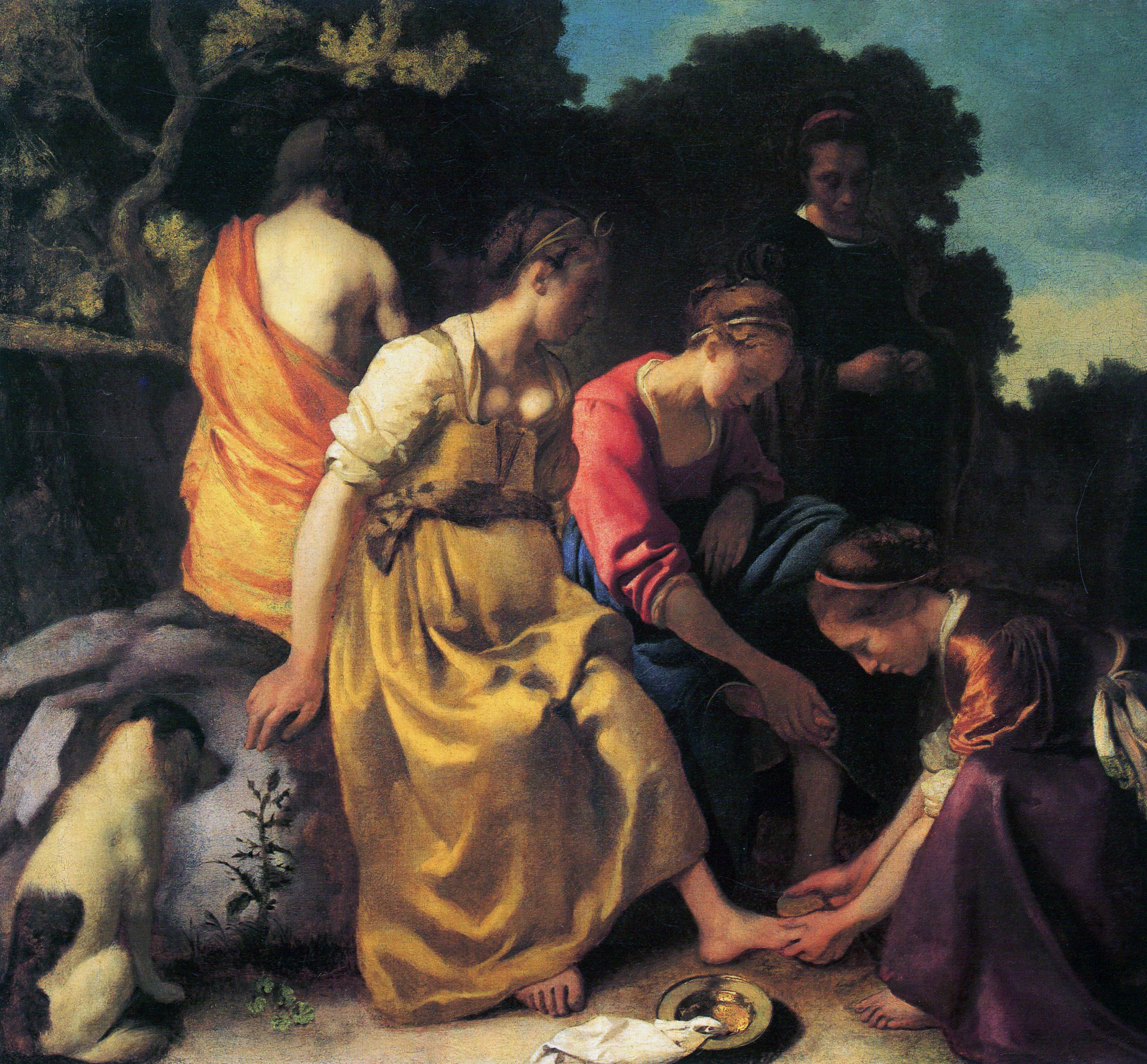
The painting with the blue-sky addition

Except for the woman whose face is completely turned away from the viewer, all of the other faces in the painting are to one degree or another in shadow, including the dog's. None of the women look at each other, each seemingly absorbed in her own thoughts, a fact which contributes to the solemn mood of the piece.

In 1999-2000, when the painting underwent restoration work and was cleaned, it was discovered that an area of blue sky in the upper right corner had been added in the 19th century. Numerous reproductions up to that time had included the blue sky. Restorers covered over the patch with foliage to approximate the original image. The canvas had also been trimmed, particularly on the right, where about 15 cm was removed. Descriptions of the scene being in a "woodland glade" or "near the edge of a wood" may rely heavily on the patch of sky erroneously thought to be original to the painting, although light without shadows does fall on the scene from above and to the left, with short shadows forming to the viewer's right. The observation that the scene appeared to be taking place in "the gathering dusk" may have been influenced by the lighter, but darkening patch of sky contrasted sharply with the dark mass of foliage in the background of the painting, together with the shadows on all the visible faces.

The painting is signed on the lower left, on the rock between the thistle and the dog.

=== Technical description ===
The canvas is a plain weave linen with a thread count of 14.3 by 10 per square centimeter. Vermeer first outlined the composition with dark brown brushwork (some of which shows through as pentimenti in the skirt of the woman washing Diana's foot. Hairs on the dog's ear were scratched in with the handle of the artist's brush. Paint has been lost in vertical lines left of the painting's center.

== Attribution and relationship to other works ==
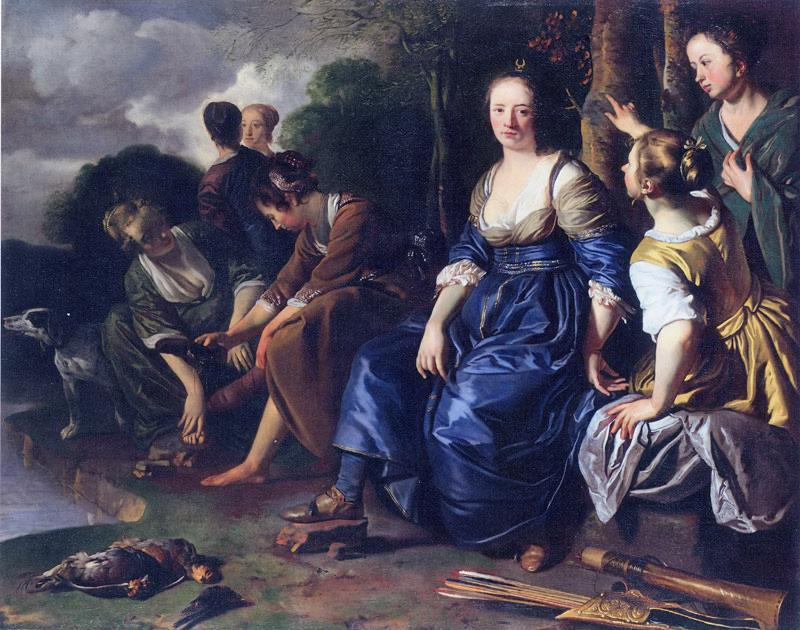
Jacob van Loo, Diana and Her Nymphs 1648.

According to Arthur K. Wheelock Jr., the painting "has no visual precedent". As a depiction of Diana, the painting is notable in part for what it does not depict—neither Actaeon catching sight of Diana and her nymphs bathing nor the actual moment when Callisto's pregnancy is revealed, both popular themes in mannerist painting in the early 17th century. Nor does the artist show Diana's hot temper or her harsh reactions to those episodes. The goddess's ability as a huntress is not signalled by dead game or bows and arrows. Even the dog is depicted as a gentle animal, not like the fast hounds normally seen in paintings of Diana.

Nor does the painting use Diana as an allegorical portrait, a tradition for which had developed by the mid-17th century, with identifiable women depicted as the goddess, who was also a symbol of chastity. An example of this tradition is Diana and Her Nymphs, painted by Jacob van Loo in Amsterdam around 1648, about seven or eight years before Vermeer's work. (Vermeer's Diana has frequently been compared to van Loo's. In van Loo's painting, Diana also sits in a forest clearing with a small group of companions, but the mood is very different.

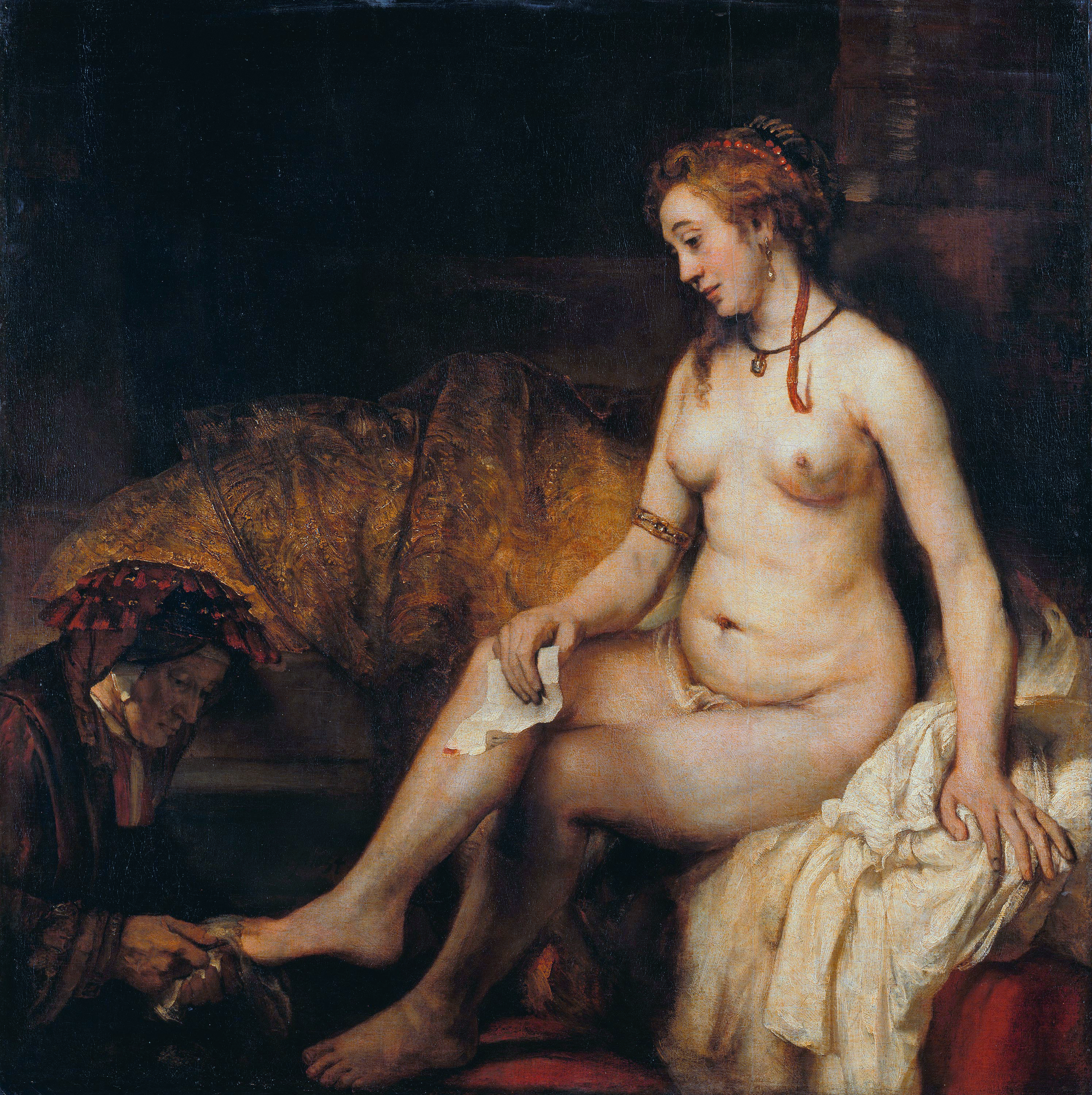
Rembrandt's Bathsheba at Her Bath

The similarities between Vermeer's painting and Rembrandt's style are close enough that the work was attributed to Rembrandt's student, Nicolaes Maes when auctioned in 1876. Vermeer's signature on the painting had been altered, making it look like Maes'. During a restoration the original signature of J. v. Meer was faintly discernible, though this was ascribed to the Utrecht artist Johannes van der Meet.

Vermeer is known to have incorporated other artists' ideas, techniques and the poses in which they depict subjects. Some features of Diana share the effects and techniques of Rembrandt. Diana's stout figure is much like those in Rembrandt's work, and Vermeer used thick impasto brushwork following the lines of the folds of her clothing, as Rembrandt did. Also like Rembrandt, Vermeer cast the faces of the group in shadows, which gives a more expressive, moodier cast to the scene. Vermeer's painting is very similar in feeling to Rembrandt's Bathsheba, painted in 1654, a work Vermeer very likely saw firsthand, according to Wheelock. The poses of the woman whose feet is washed and the one doing the washing are similar. It is possible that Rembrandt's former pupil, Carel Fabritius (in Delft from 1650 until his death in late 1654), may have made Vermeer familiar with Rembrandt's work.

Doubts about the attribution of the painting remained until about 1901, the year Abraham Bredius and Willem Martin, deputy director of the Mauritshuis, discovered its similarities in coloring and technique with Martha and Mary, which was signed by Vermeer, and in colors with The Procuress, another very early Vermeer work.

== Critical commentary ==
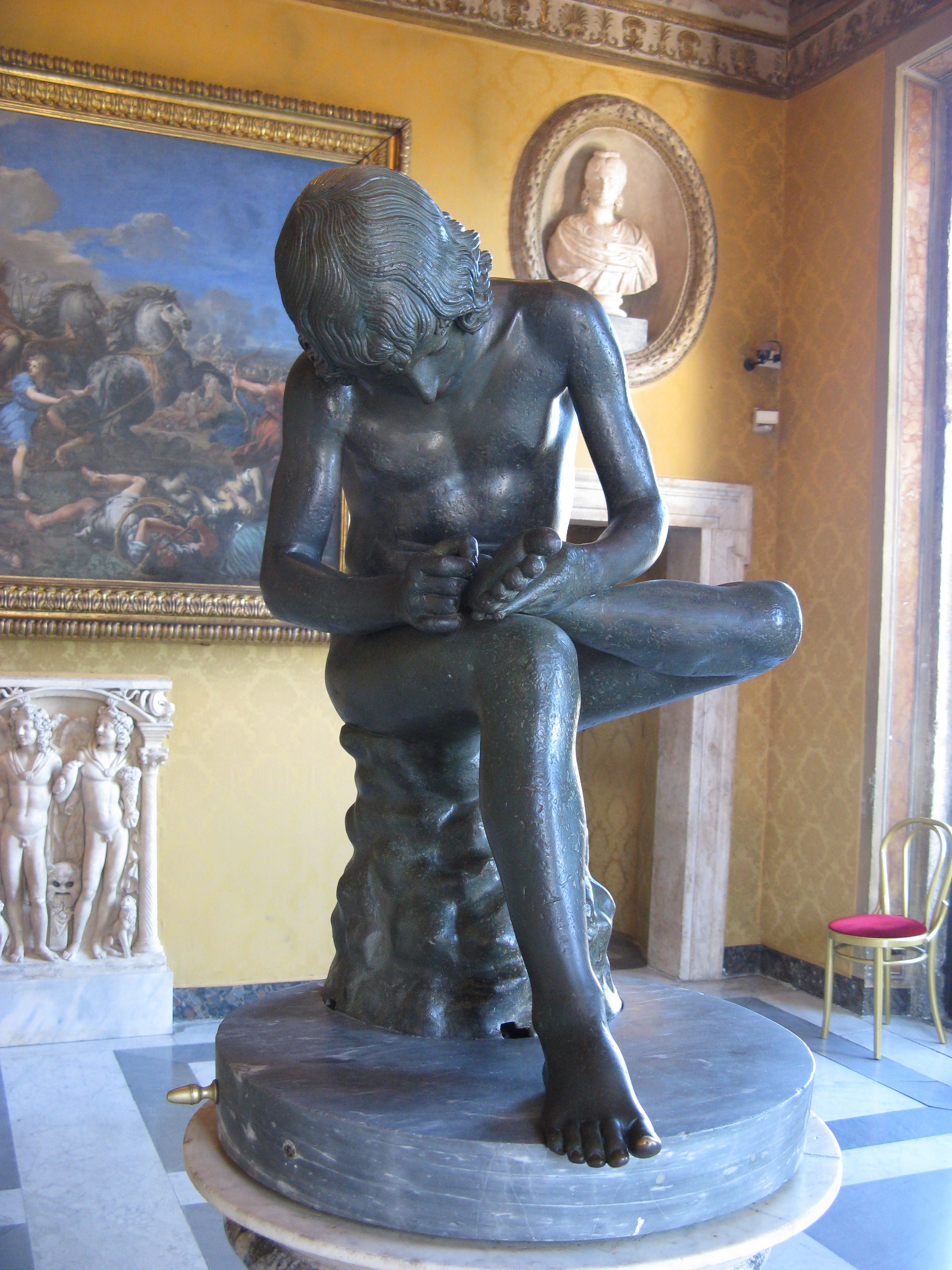
The Spinario

The painting has an "overwhelming sense of solemnity more associated with Christian than with mythological traditions", according to Wheelock. The work may combine the Christian symbolism of foot-washing as purification with the allusions to chastity and purity invoked by Diana's modest dress and the white cloth and brass basin at her feet. The companion holding her own foot strongly resembles the ancient Spinario statue, a figure in a nearly identical pose, who is removing a thorn from the bottom of his foot. The thorn is a Christian symbol of the grief and trials of Jesus or of the suffering in this world.

Foot washing is also a Christian symbol of humility and the nearness of death, and "the dignity with which Diana's companion performs her service recalls mary Magdalene washing Christ's feet with her tears", according to Wheelock (Christ also kneeled before his disciples and washed their feet at the Last Supper). Selena Cant believes Vermeer's contemporaries would have immediately drawn the association of foot-washing with the idea of Jesus washing feet. "[T]his maidservant steals the scene", according to Cant, who points out the "unusual brown-bronze bodice" worn by the servant.

According to Wheelock, the painting "has [...] no obvious literary source". As a depiction of Diana, the painting is notable in part for what it does not depict—neither Actaeon catching sight of Diana and her nymphs bathing nor the actual moment when Callisto's pregnancy is revealed, both popular themes in mannerist painting in the early 17th century. Nor does the artist show Diana's hot temper or her harsh reactions to those episodes. The goddess's ability as a huntress is not signalled by dead game or bows and arrows. Even the dog is depicted as a gentle animal, not like the fast hounds normally seen in paintings of Diana.

Ovid's Metamorphoses mentions that just before discovering Callisto's pregnancy, Diana washed her feet and then she and her attendants disrobed. Walter Liedtke points out that the nymph standing somewhat apart from the group, with her hands clenched in front of her abdomen, perhaps in contrast with the nymph showing devotion and fidelity by washing feet, may be Callisto. This scene would then illustrate part of that myth narrative, Liedtke asserts, although Wheelock states that the episode seems unrelated to the mood of the painting.

The painting, according to Liedtke, "shows the artist already addressing his usual theme, women in private moments, and the complications of desire" as well as "the ability to sympathetically describe the private lives of women," and, while not as "profound" as Rembrandt's Bathsheba, Vermeer's work is "remarkable for its tenderness and sincerity", Liedtke believes. He notes that the painting shows the artist's aptitude for learning from the example of other artists and for observing light and color.

== Dating and position within Vermeer's life and work ==
The painting was created at about the time (or within a few years after) Vermeer joined the painters' guild in Delft on December 29, 1653, at the age of 21, the same year he converted to Catholicism and married Catharina Bolnes. Leidtke speculates that the ideas of purity and fidelity symbolized in the painting were connected to Vermeer's marriage, and that perhaps the work was created in tribute to his new wife.

With its less assured brushwork and cautious arrangement of elements, Diana is less mature in its technique and positioning of the figures than Martha and Mary, which may indicate the other work was painted afterward, as Vermeer's experience grew, according to Liedtke.

== Provenance and exhibitions ==
Neville Davison Goldsmid of The Hague owned the painting from 1866-1875, before it passed into the hands of his widow, Eliza Garey of The Hague and Paris. She sold it with other works at the Goldsmid sale on May 4, 1876, when Victor de Stuers bought it for the collection of the Koninklijk Kabinet van Schilderijen Mauritshuis, the Hague.

Exhibitions:

- London, 1929
- Amsterdam, 1945
- Milan, 1951
- Zurich, 1953
- Rome, Milan, 1954
- New York, Toledo, Toronto, 1954-1955
- The Hague, Paris, 1966
- Tokyo, Kyoto, 1968-1969
- Washington, Detroit, Amsterdam 1980-1981
- Washington and other cities (shown in Tokyo only), 1982-1984
- Washington, The Hague, 1995-1996
- Rotterdam, Frankfort, 1999-2000

== Condition ==
The painting is in relatively poor condition. It has been cleaned and restored on a number of occasions and has depreciated as a result. Several areas of the canvas differ significantly from the original work.

== See also ==
- List of paintings by Johannes Vermeer
- Dutch Golden Age painting

== Sources ==
- Cant, Serena (2009). Vermeer and His World 1632-1675. Quercus. pp. 16–19. ISBN 978-1-84916-005-6.
- Liedtke, Walter A. (2001). Vermeer and the Delft School. Metropolitan Museum of Art. ISBN 978-0-87099-973-4.
- Swillens, P. T. A. (1950). Johannes Vermeer, Painter of Delft, 1632-1675. Utrecht: Spectrum.
- Wheelock, Arthur K. Jr., ed. (1995). Johannes Vermeer. New Haven: Yale University Press. pp. 96–101. ISBN 978-0-300-06558-9.
