= Lungarno Torrigiani =

Coordinates: 43°45′58.49″N 11°15′23.01″E

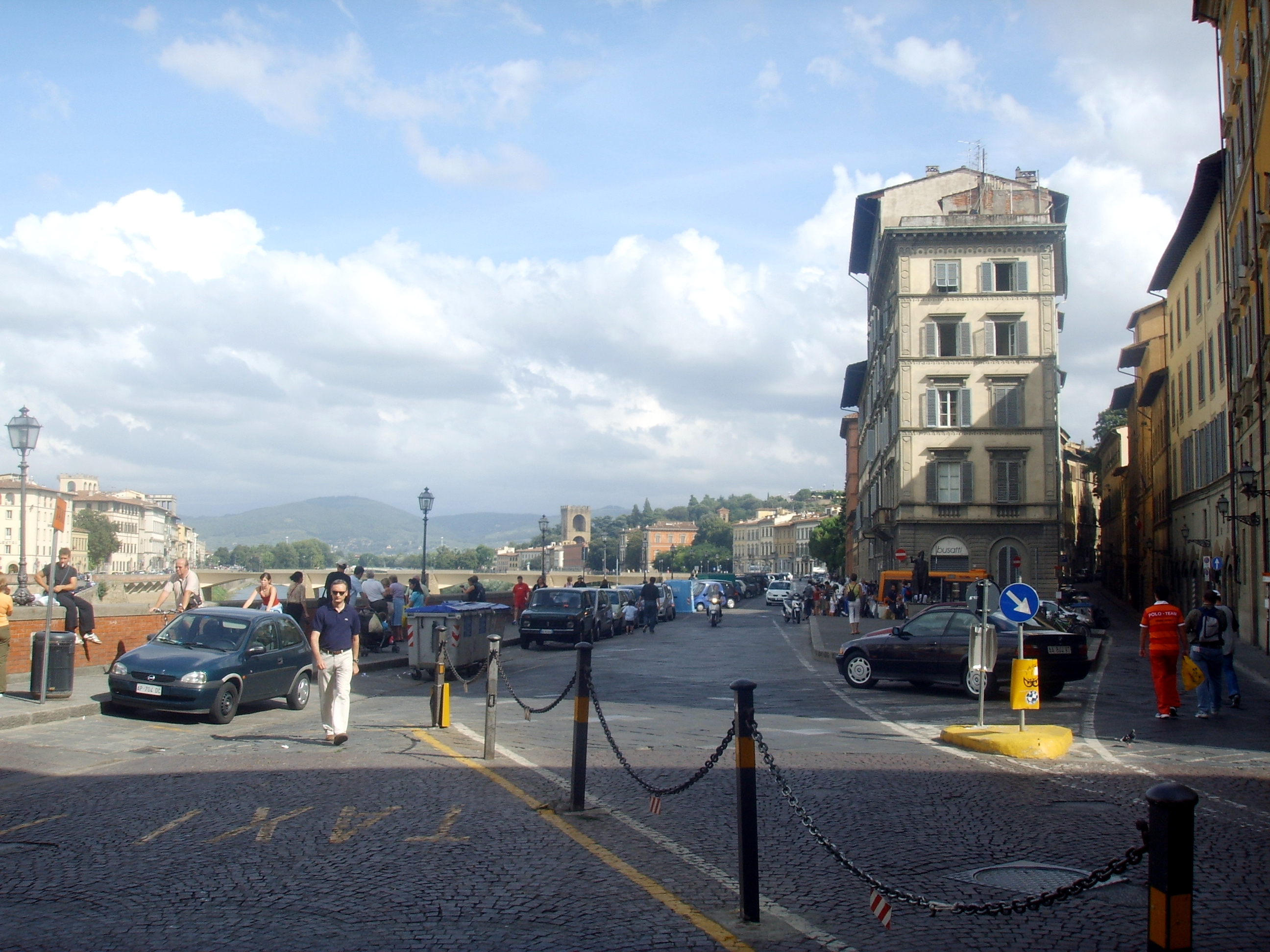
Lungarno Torrigiani, with Palazzo Tempi in the foreground

Lungarno Torrigiani is the stretch of the south bank of the Arno river in Florence that goes from Via de 'Bardi to the Ponte alle Grazie. From the Lungarno, there's an extraordinary view of the Uffizi, the Vasari Corridor and Ponte Vecchio.

== History and description ==
The Lungarno takes its name from the Torrigiani family, who owned Palazzo Tempi for a certain period. Almost in the corner with Piazza dei Mozzi there is a rectangular green area, equipped with benches, which overlooks the Evangelical Lutheran church, in neo-Gothic style. On 25 May 2016 at 6:15 am, a 3 and a half meter chasm opened due to the rupture of a large water pipe under the Lungarno road, after which thousands of homes were left without running water.

== Sources ==
- Cesati, Francesco (2003). La grande guida delle strade di Firenze. Rome: Newton Compton Editori.
