= The Rape of Lucretia (Ficherelli) =

Paintings attributed to Felice Ficherelli

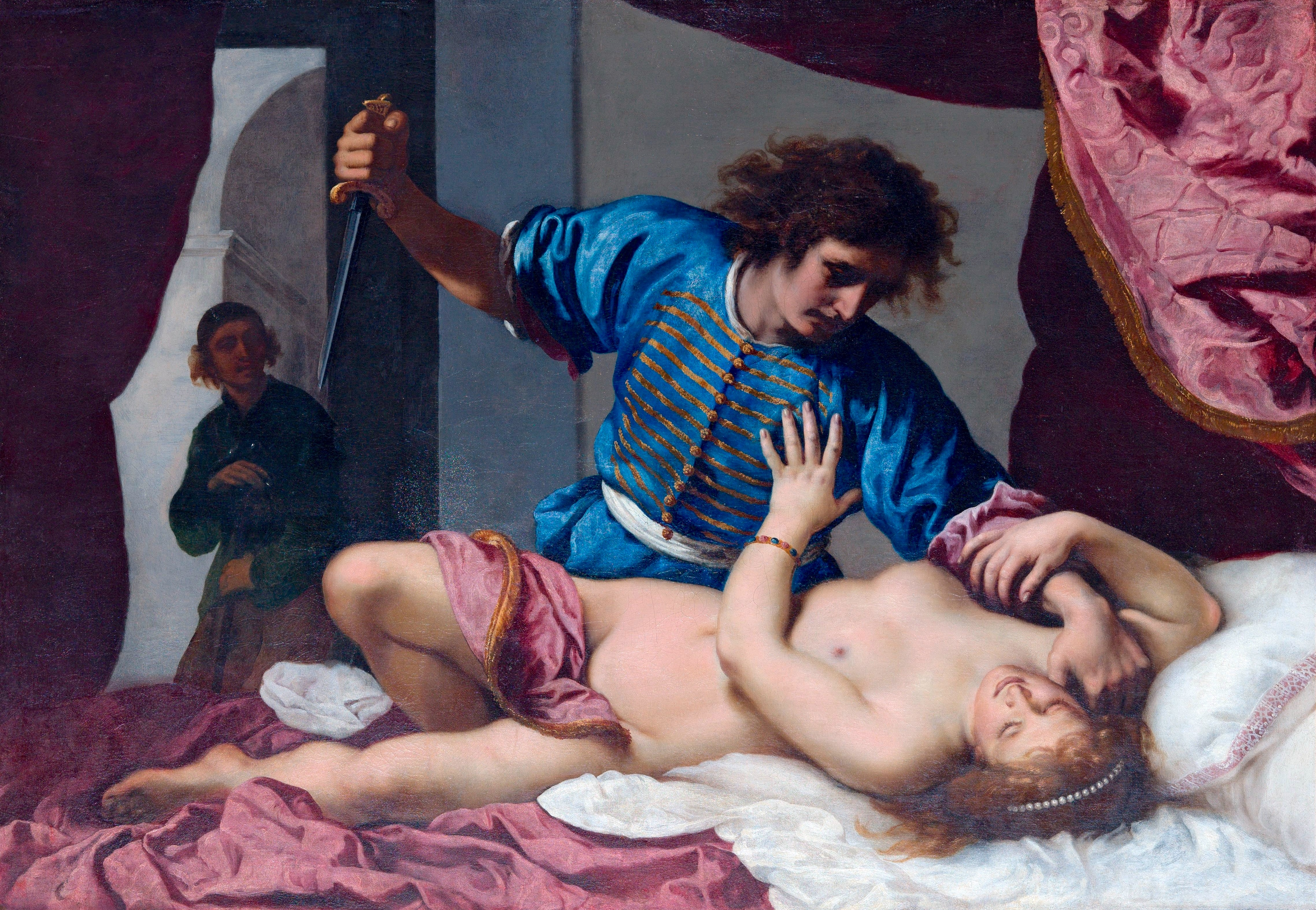
Original in Rome, with colours adjusted

The Rape of Lucretia (also catalogued as Lucretia and Tarquin, Tarquinius and Lucretia, and otherwise) is any of several paintings, variations of the same subject, which are usually attributed to either Felice Ficherelli or Guido Cagnacci and dated to the late 1630s or about 1640.

The first and much larger version is in the gallery of the Accademia Nazionale di San Luca, Rome. It is traditionally attributed to Cagnacci, but more recent scholarship favours Ficherelli. There is an autograph replica in the storage of the Florentine Galleries. Another, smaller copy on copper is in the Wallace Collection, London.

The subject is the legendary rape of Lucretia, as recounted by the ancient Roman historian Livy; specifically the moment in Livy's account when Tarquinius has Lucretia cornered at sword-point in her bedchamber and threatens to kill and disgrace her.

== Description ==
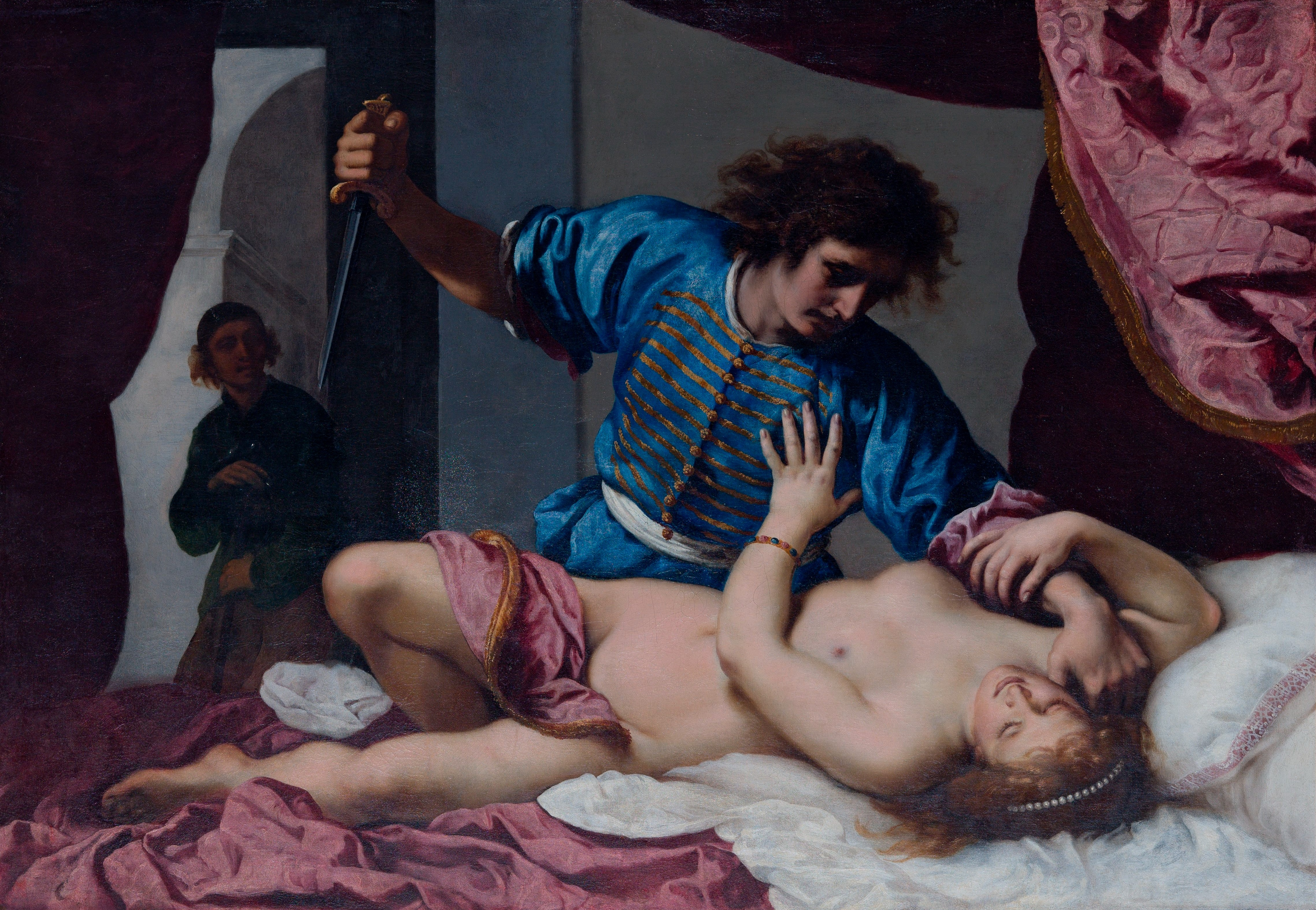
Original in Rome

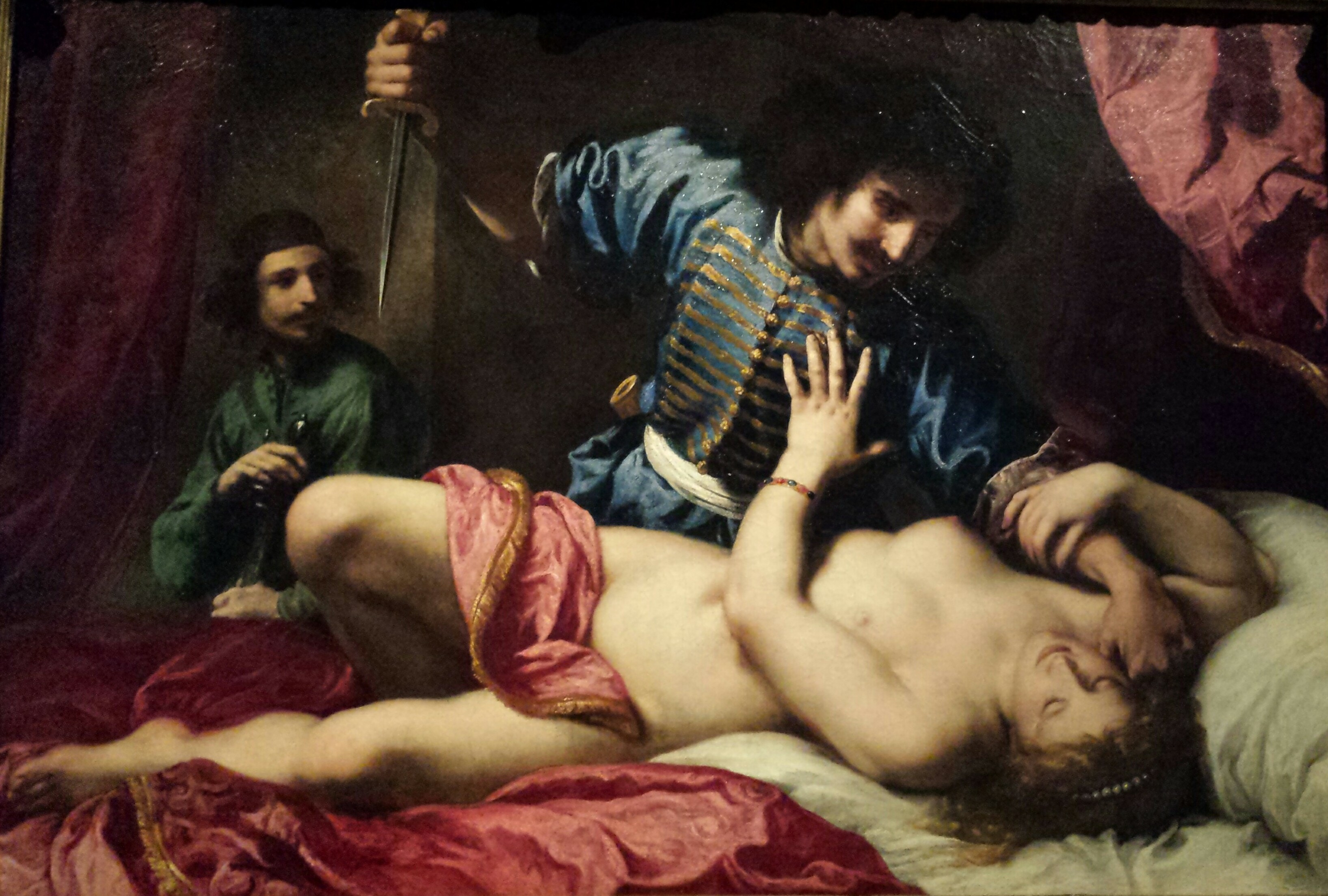
Replica in Florence

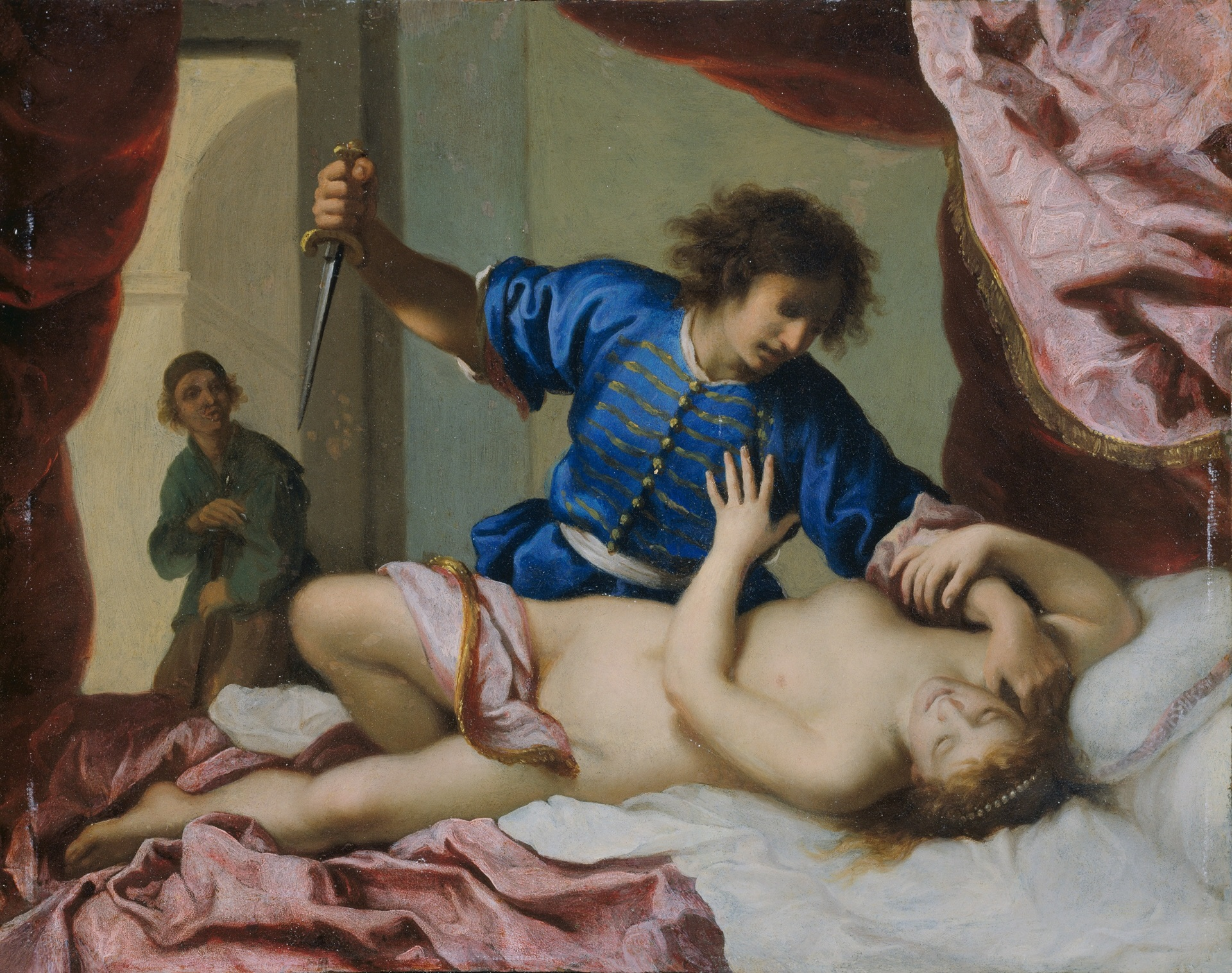
Replica in London

The subject is from Livy's Ab Urbe Condita (1.57–9). Lucretia was a Roman noblewoman, wife of Lucius Tarquinius Collatinus, famed for her beauty and domestic virtues. Sextus Tarquinius, one of the sons of Tarquinius Superbus, king of Rome, was so inflamed by her beauty and purity that he endeavoured to ravish her whilst enjoying the hospitality of his absent comrade, Collatinus.

Tarquinius secretly entered Lucretia's bedchamber at night, wakening her with an announcement of the sword in his hand. After failing repeatedly to persuade her to his lust, he finally threatened to kill her and one of his slaves and lay their corpses naked together, falsely informing her kinsmen that he had discovered the pair in the act of adultery and so slew them; whereupon she acquiesced. (Note: "Burning with passion, he waited till it seemed to him that all about him was secure and everybody fast asleep; then, drawing his sword, he came to the sleeping Lucretia. Holding the woman down with his left hand on her breast, he said, 'Be still, Lucretia! I am Sextus Tarquinius. My sword is in my hand. Utter a sound, and you die!' In affright the woman started out of her sleep. No help was in sight, but only imminent death. Then Tarquinius began to declare his love, to plead, to mingle threats with prayers, to bring every resource to bear upon her woman's heart. When he found her obdurate and not to be moved even by fear of death, he went farther and threatened her with disgrace, saying that when she was dead he would kill his slave and lay him naked by her side, that she might be said to have been put to death in adultery with a man of base condition. At this dreadful prospect her resolute modesty was overcome, as if with force, by his victorious lust; and Tarquinius departed, exulting in his conquest of a woman's honour.")

Having been outraged by Tarquinius, Lucretia faithfully informed her father and her husband, and, after exacting an oath of vengeance from them, stabbed herself to death. Lucius Junius Brutus, her husband's cousin, then led his kinsmen and their followers to overthrow the Tarquin monarchy and establish the Roman Republic. (Note: The king was banished to Caere in Etruria, while Sextus Tarquinius fled to Gabii, "as though it had been his own kingdom, and there the revengers of old quarrels, which he had brought upon himself by murder and rapine, slew him.") This story, which is also found in Ovid's Fasti, (Note: "His repast over, the hour of slumber came. 'Twas night, and not a taper shone in the whole house. He rose, and from the gilded scabbard he drew his sword, and came into thy chamber, virtuous spouse. And when he touched the bed, 'The steel is in my hand, Lucretia,' said he, 'I that speak am the king's son and Tarquin.' She answered never a word. Voice and power of speech and thought itself fled from her breast. But she trembled, as trembles a little lamb that, caught straying from the fold, lies low under a ravening wolf. What could she do? Should she struggle? In a struggle a woman will always be worsted. Should she cry out? But in his clutch was a sword to silence her. Should she fly? His hands pressed heavy on her breast, the breast that till then had never known the touch of stranger hand. Her lover foe is urgent with prayers, with bribes, with threats; but still he cannot move her by prayers, by bribes, by threats. 'Resistance is vain,' said he, 'I'll rob thee of honour and of life. I, the adulterer, will bear false witness to thine adultery. I'll kill a slave, and rumour will have it that thou wert caught with him.' Overcome by fear of infamy, the dame gave way.") is the source of many Baroque works.

In the foreground of the painting, Tarquinius wears a gold-embroidered blue coat with the sleeves rolled up for the vulgar task ahead. Lucretia is abed, nude but for a small fold of her pinkish coverlet, and resists Tarquinius, who holds her with his left hand and threatens her with a dagger (resembling a stiletto) in his right. She tries to use her arms defensively and a blush of mingled shame and exertion reddens her cheeks. There are pearls in her dark blonde hair. In the left of the background, Tarquinius's slave keeps sentinel, looking from a doorway.

The costume and interior have been updated from ancient Rome to the 17th century, transforming the scene into the recognisable bedroom of a modern Italian home. Aristide Sartorio (1911) provides the following, unsupported anecdote: "[T]he artist's daring innovation of robing Tarquin as a soldier of his day caused some astonishment among our forefathers then unused to such up to date freedoms." However, Titian's Tarquin and Lucretia of 1571 had also depicted contemporary dress. Francesca Baldassari notes the theatrical effect of the gold-fringed maroon and lilac curtains or drapes which frame the action like a play; also the position of the figures, close to the picture plane and slightly above the viewer's gaze.

=== Versions ===
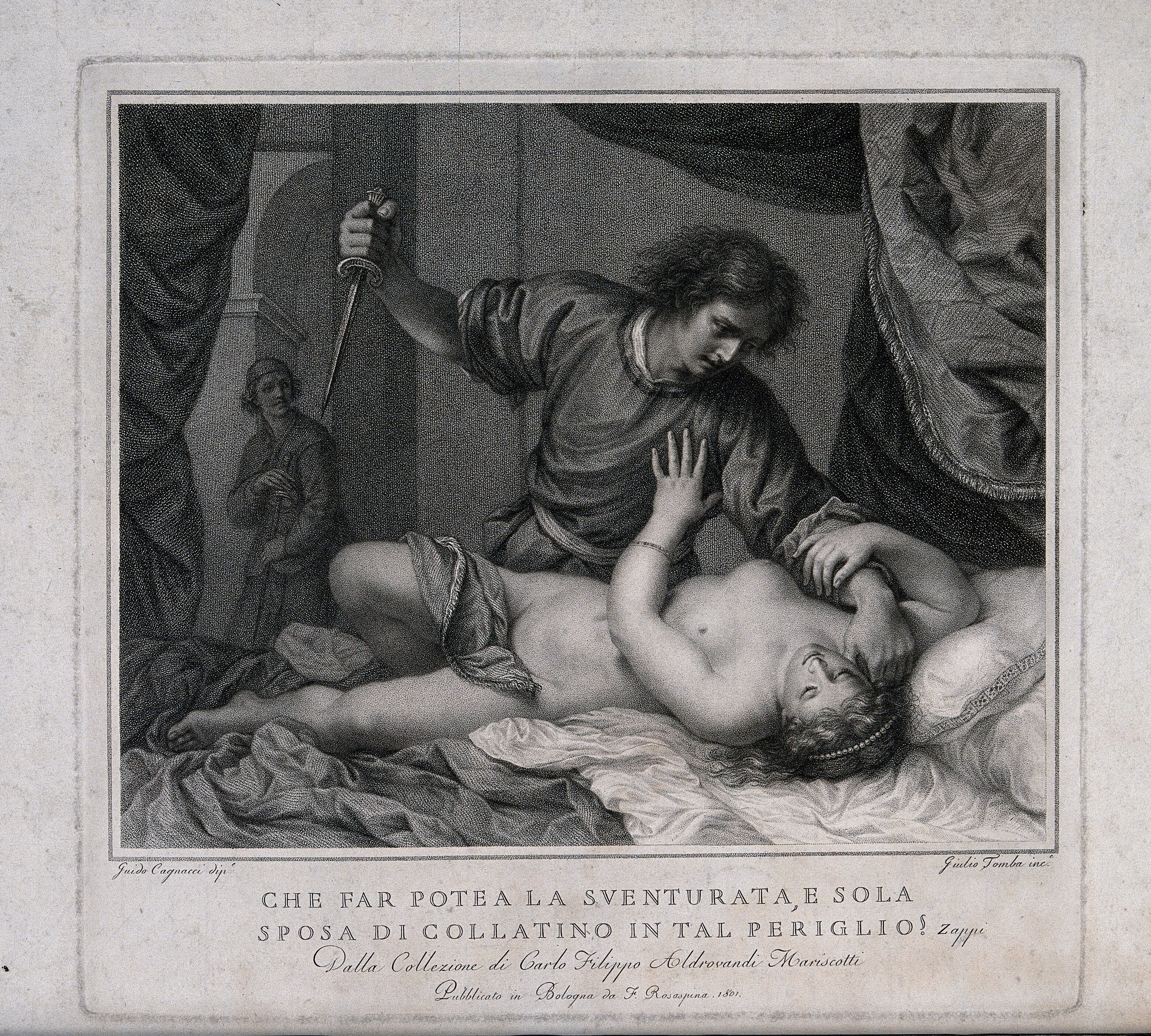
Engraving by Giulio Tomba, 1801

- Tarquinius and Lucretia (Italian: Tarquinio e Lucrezia) is an oil on canvas painting, measuring 163.5 × 117 cm. The picture came into the possession of the Accademia Nazionale di San Luca in Rome in 1842, apparently because it was left at some remote date in the gallery's charge and never reclaimed. It has been traditionally attributed to Guido Cagnacci, and sometimes to Giovanni Bilivert or Cristoforo Allori, but is now thought to be by Felice Ficherelli. The composition was engraved (23.2 × 29 cm) by Giulio Tomba.
- Tarquinius Killing Lucretia (Italian: Tarquinio che uccide Lucrezia), also in oils, is an almost full-size replica, the canvas measuring 117 × 159 cm. The picture is listed in the storage of the Florentine Galleries (Depositi delle Gallerie Fiorentine), but is apparently now in the Museo Civico, Prato.
- The Rape of Lucretia is much smaller oil on copper replica, measuring 24.5 × 29.9 cm, in a frame 42 × 47.5 × 8 cm. It was once part of the art collection of Richard Seymour-Conway, 4th Marquess of Hertford. The picture was cleaned and repaired by Herbert Lank for the Wallace Collection in 1983. This version omits Lucretia's jewelled gold bracelet and differs from the original also in the colouring of the drapery and a few other minor details, but is otherwise a faithful copy.
- Tarquinius and Lucretia (German: Tarquinius und Lukrezia) is a close copy nearer the scale of the original, measuring 128.5 × 191 cm. The Gemäldegalerie in Dresden acquired the picture in 1722 as a copy by Guercino. It has also been attributed to Luca Giordano. Emilio Taruffi (1633–1696) painted a copy of the Lucretia, which some found to be more beautiful in parts than the original. It is possible that the Dresden image is this copy by Taruffi.
Early versions

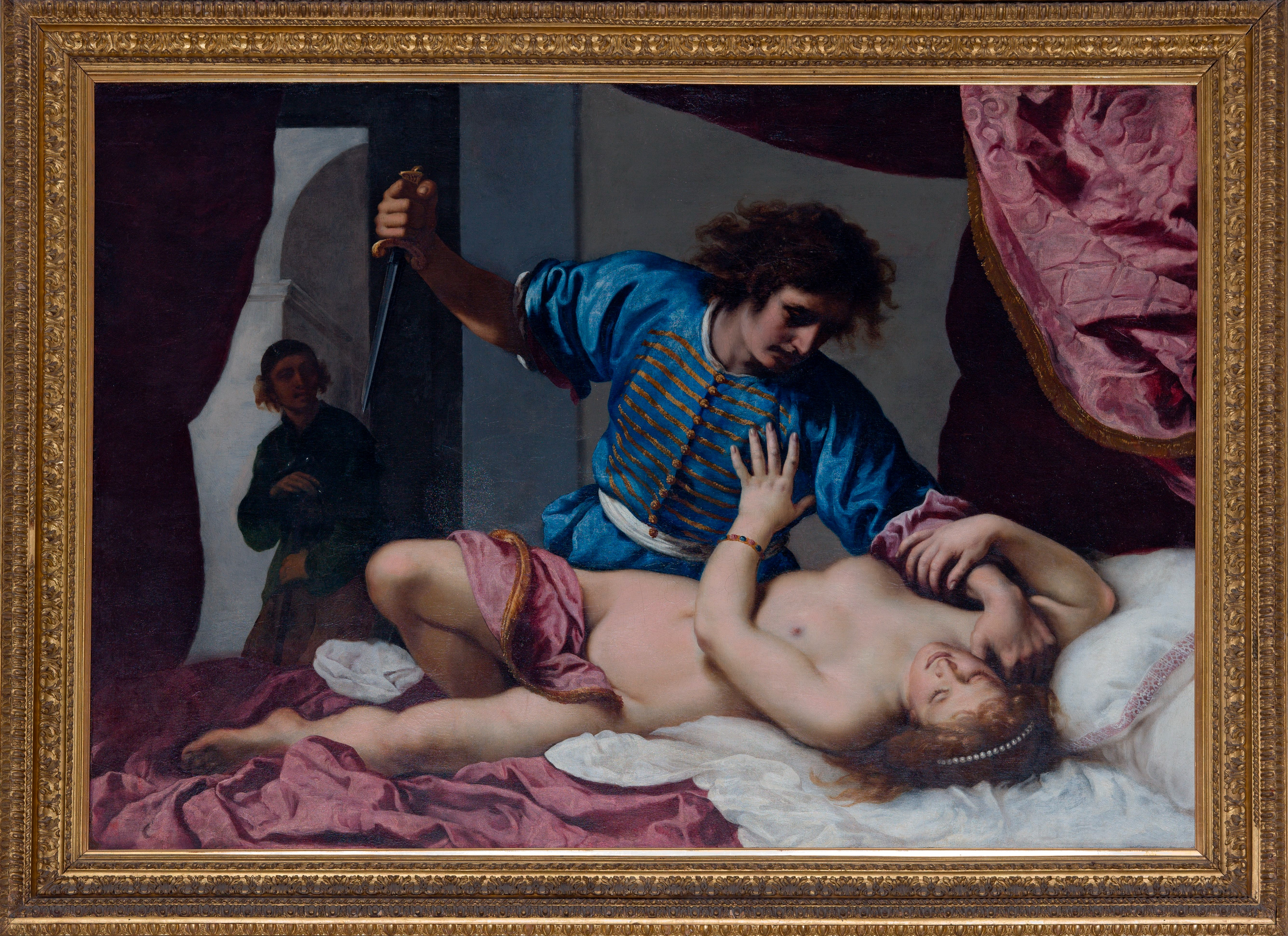
Ficherelli or Cagnacci, c. 1640 (Accademia di San Luca, Rome)

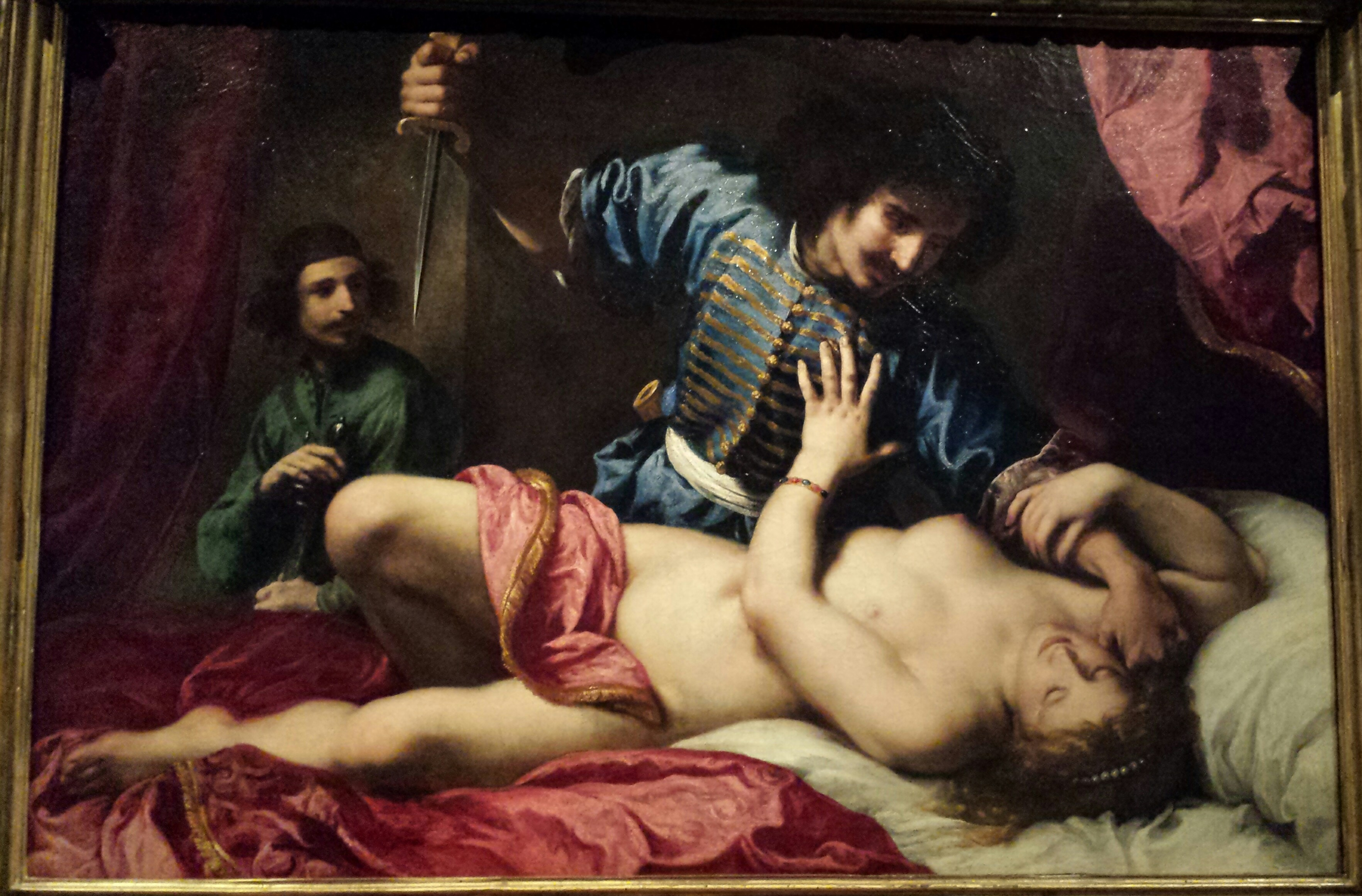
Ficherelli (Depositi delle Gallerie Fiorentine)

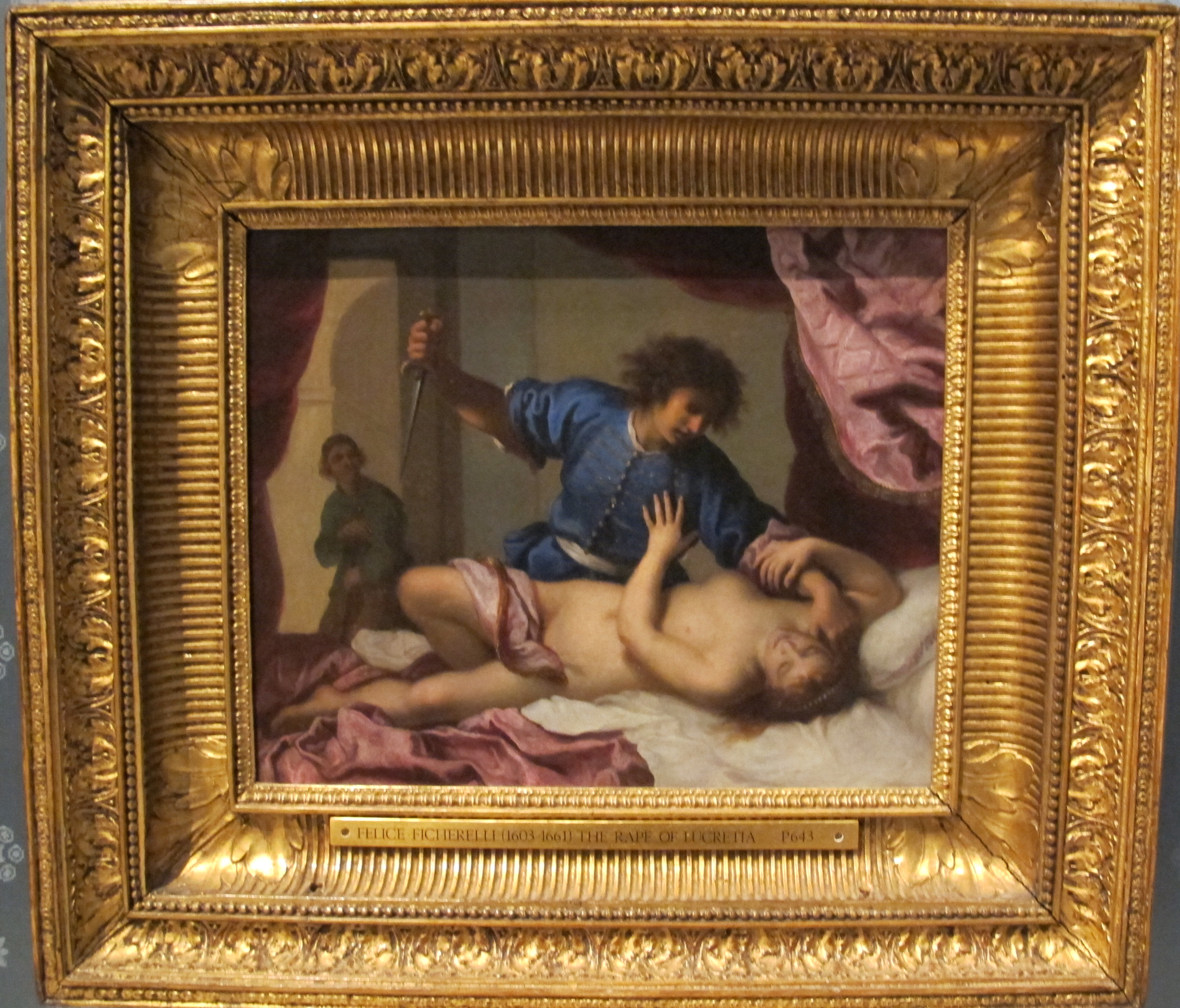
Ficherelli (Wallace Collection, London)
Later copies

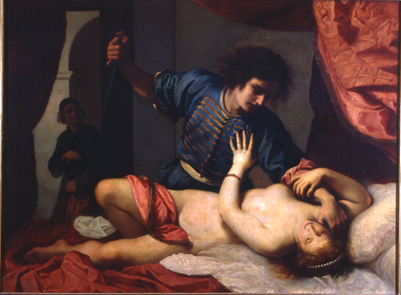
Marià Fortuny Marsal, c. 1861 (Reial Acadèmia Catalana de Belles Arts de Sant Jordi, Barcelona)

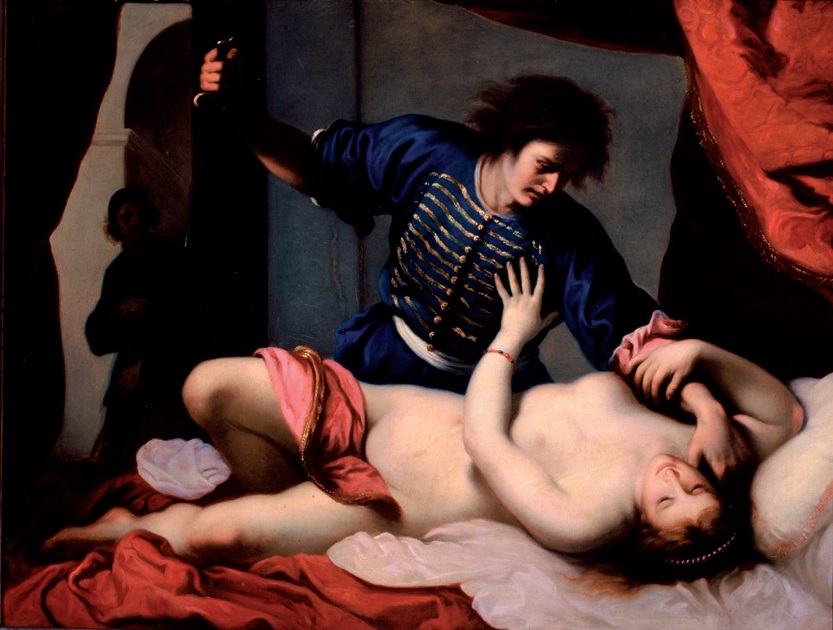
Victor Meirelles, 1850s

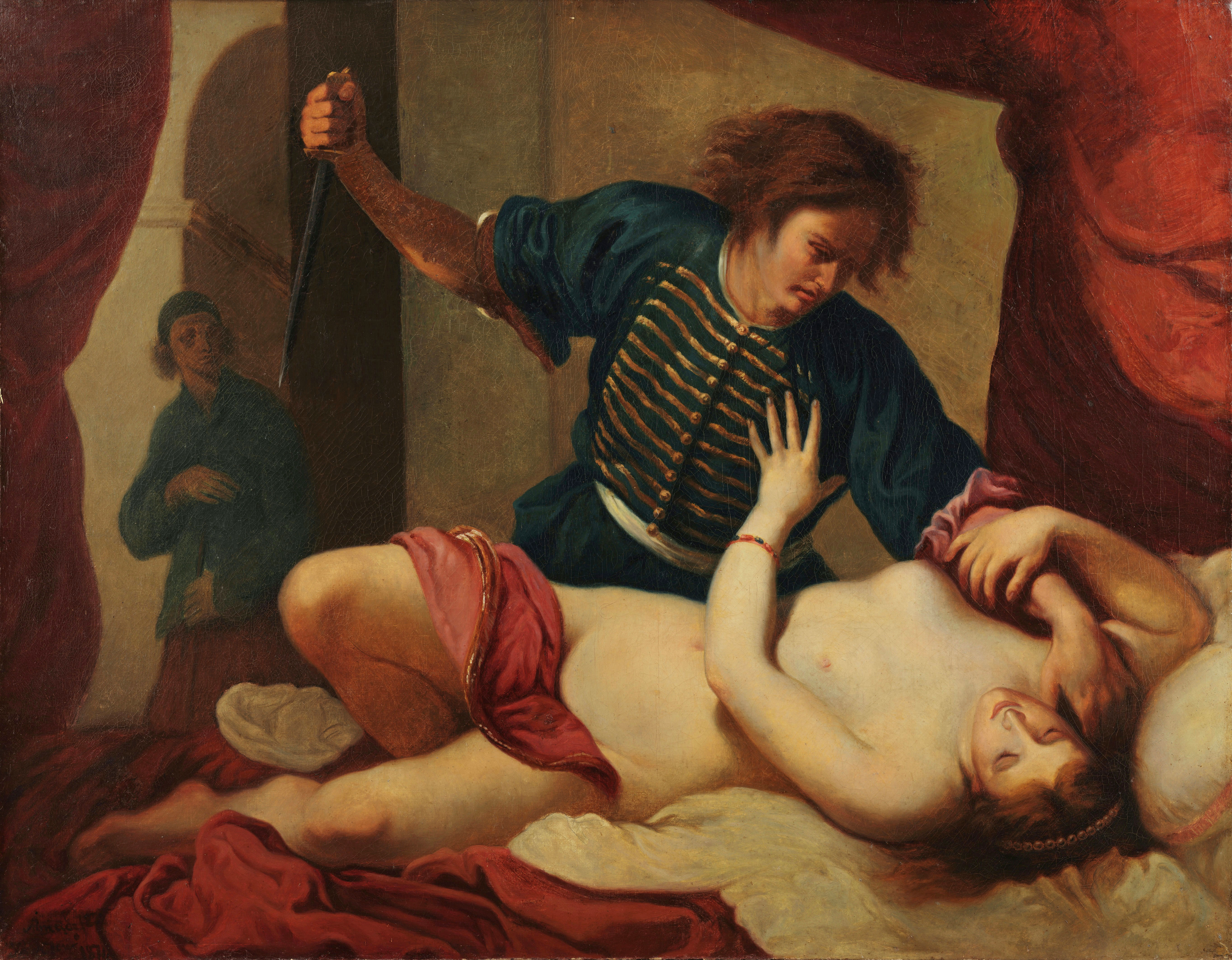
Almeida Júnior after Meirelles, 1874 (Pinacoteca do Estado de São Paulo)

== See also ==
- Lucretia (Artemisia Gentileschi, Potsdam)
- Lucretia and Tarquin (Luca Giordano)

== Bibliography ==
- Champlin, John Denison Jr.; Perkins, Charles C., eds. (1887). "Lucretia and Tarquin". Cyclopedia of Painters and Paintings. Vol. 3. New York: Charles Scribner's Sons. p. 110.
- Duffy, Stephen; Hedley, Jo (2004). The Wallace Collection's Pictures: A Complete Catalogue. London: The Wallace Collection. p. 144.
- Ingamells, John (1985). The Wallace Collection: Catalogue of Pictures. Vol. 1. London: The Wallace Collection. pp. 220–1.
- Lanzi, Luigi (1847). The History of Painting in Italy. Vol. 3. Translated by Roscoe, Thomas (New ed.). London: Henry G. Bohn. p. 103.
- Leoncini, Giovanni (1997). "Ficherelli, Felice". Dizionario Biografico degli Italiani. Vol. 47 (online ed.). Treccani.
- Sartorio, Aristide (1911). The Gallery of St. Luke. Musei E Gallerie D'Italia 9–10. Rome: Gaetano Garzoni Provenzani. pp. xvii, 39.
- Woermann, Karl (1908). Katalog der Königlichen Gemäldegalerie zu Dresden (in German). Dresden: Kunstanstalt Wilhelm Hoffmann. p. 148, no. 375.
- Pictures and Drawings: With Historical Notes, Short Lives of the Painters, and 380 Illustrations. Wallace Collection Catalogues (14th ed.). London: His Majesty's Stationery Office. 1920 [1900]. pp. 41–2.
- "Lucretia" . Encyclopædia Britannica. Vol. 17 (11th ed.). 1911. p. 106.
