= Woman with a Parrot =

Woman with a Parrot may refer to the following paintings:

- Woman with a Parrot at a Window, also called Woman with a Parrot, 1666 painting by Caspar Netscher, National Gallery of Art, Washington, D.C.
- Woman Stroking a Parrot, also called Woman with a Parrot, 1827 painting by Eugène Delacroix, Museum of Fine Arts of Lyon
- Woman with a Parrot (Courbet), 1866, in the Metropolitan Museum of Art, New York
- A Young Lady in 1866, also called Woman with a Parrot, an 1866 painting by Édouard Manet, in the Metropolitan Museum of Art, New York
- Woman with Parakeet (Renoir), also called Woman with a Parrot, 1871, in the Solomon R. Guggenheim Museum, New York
