= Young Woman Seated at a Virginal =

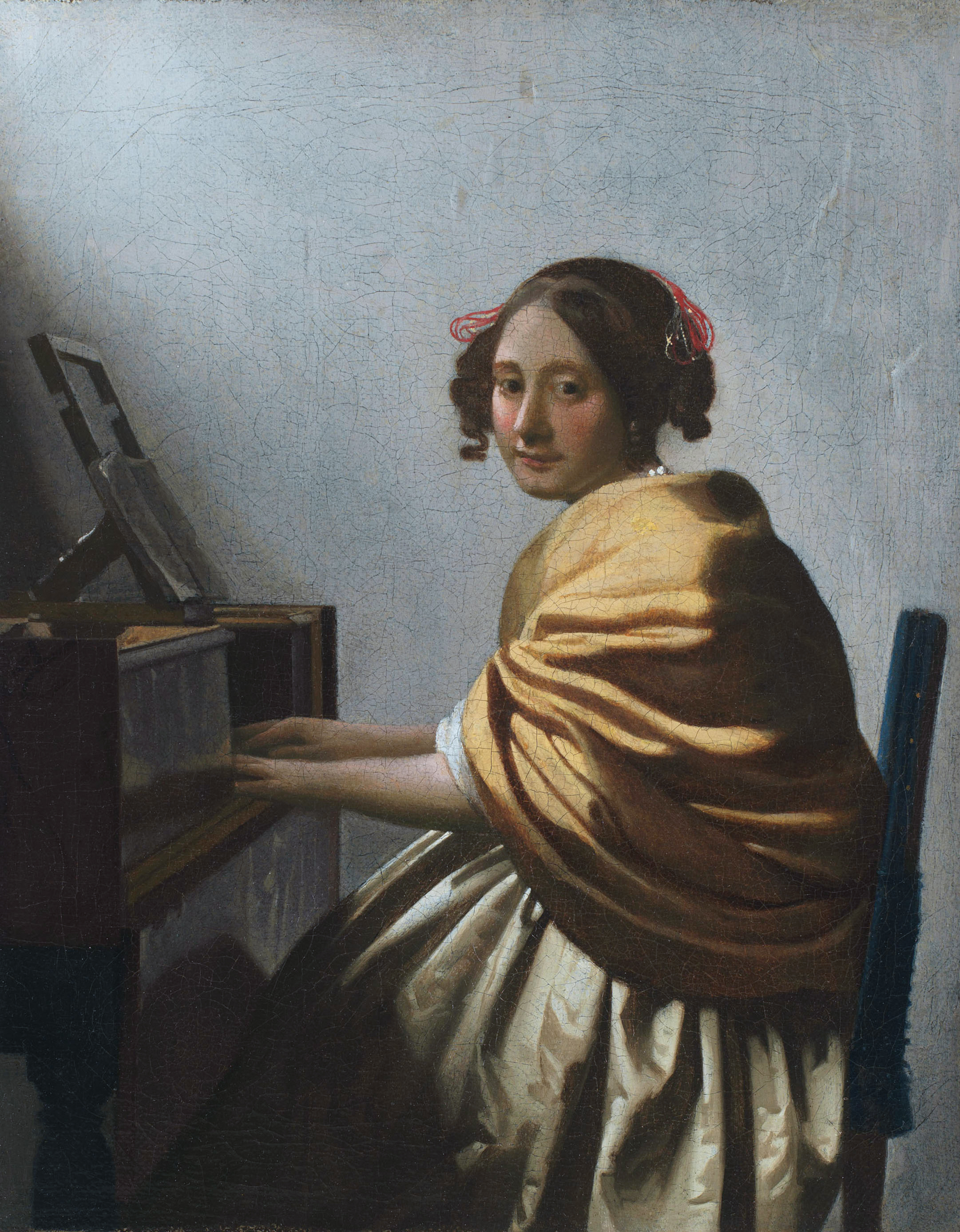
A Young Woman Seated at the Virginals at the Metropolitan Museum of Art in New York

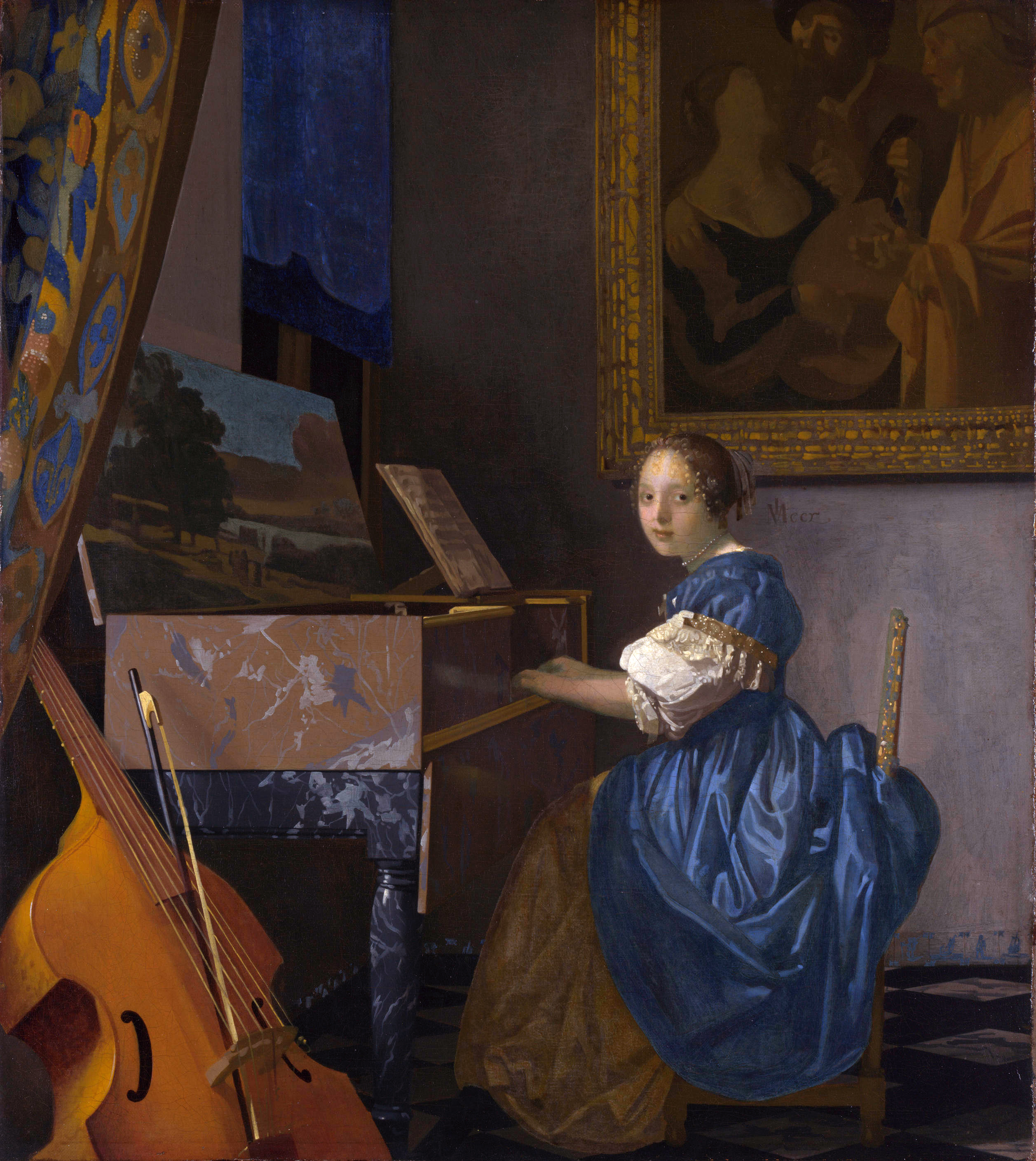
Lady Seated at a Virginal at the National Gallery, London

Young Woman Seated at a Virginal or A Young Woman Seated at a Virginal are alternate titles for two different works of art, neither of which is a copy of the other, both by Johannes Vermeer:

- A Young Woman Seated at the Virginals, Leiden Collection, New York
- Lady Seated at a Virginal at the National Gallery, London

Both paintings may have the title "Young Woman Seated at a Virginal", although other sources use the alternate titles given here. Both paintings are estimated to have been painted sometime from 1670 to 1672.

== See also ==
- Lady Standing at a Virginal (1673-1675), a different painting by Vermeer with almost the same name
- List of paintings by Johannes Vermeer, including paintings of other women with virginals and other musical instruments
