= The Lacemaker (Vermeer) =

1669–1670 painting by Johannes Vermeer

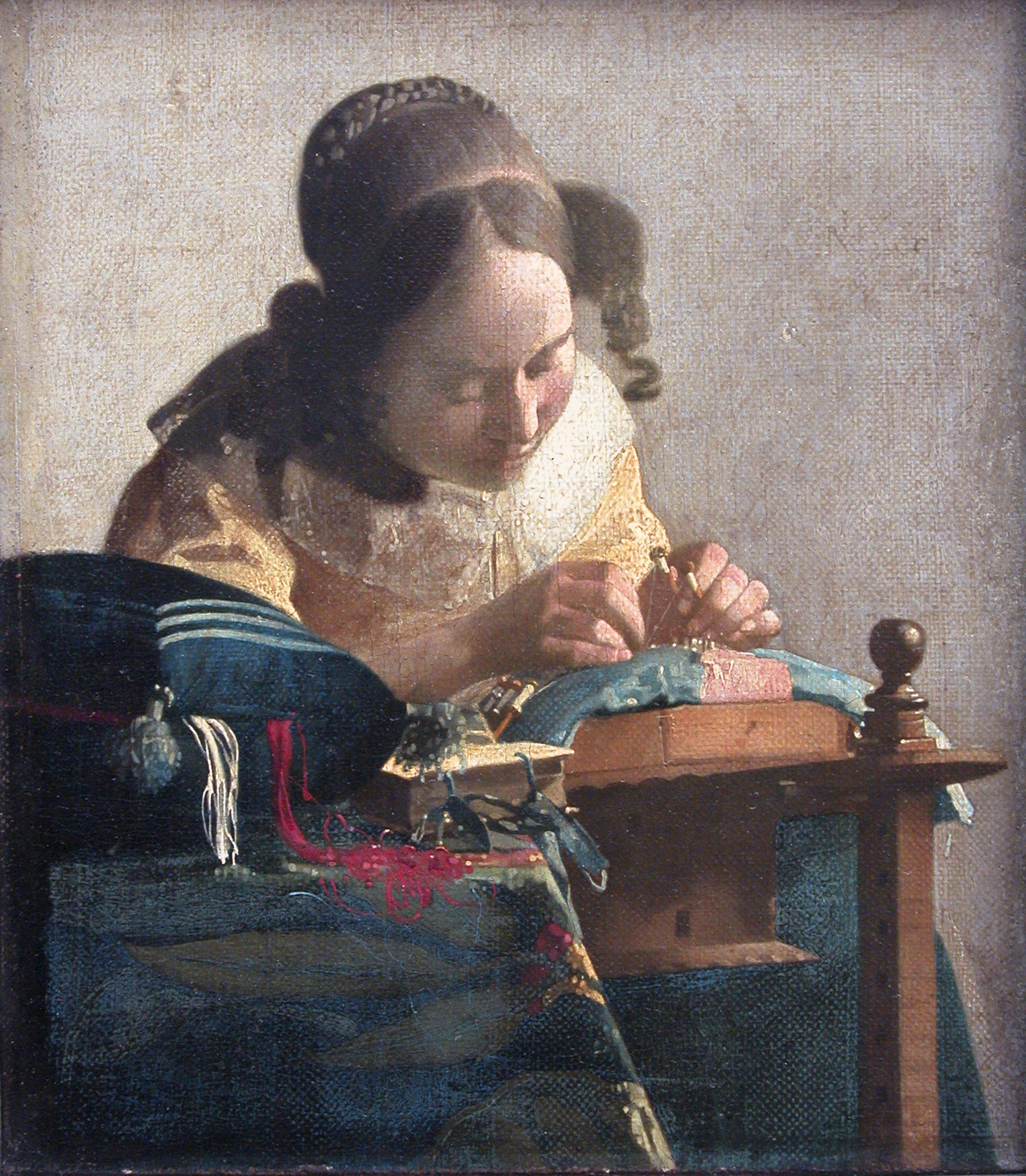
- Artist: Johannes Vermeer
- Year: c. 1669–1670
- Medium: Oil on canvas
- Dimensions: 24.5 cm × 21 cm (9.6 in × 8.3 in)
- Location: Louvre, Paris

The Lacemaker is a painting by the Dutch artist Johannes Vermeer (1632–1675), completed around 1669–1670 and held in the Louvre, Paris. The work shows a young woman wearing a yellow bodice, holding up a pair of bobbins in her left hand as she carefully places a pin in the pillow on which she is making her bobbin lace.

== Description ==
At 24.5 cm × 21 cm (9.6 in × 8.3 in), the work is the smallest of Vermeer's paintings, seen by one author as one of his most abstract and unusual. The canvas used was cut from the same bolt as that used for A Young Woman Seated at the Virginals, and both paintings seem to have had identical dimensions originally.

The girl is set against a blank wall, probably because the artist sought to eliminate any external distractions from the central image. As with his The Astronomer (1668) and The Geographer (1669), it is likely that the artist undertook careful study before he executed the work; the art of lacemaking is portrayed closely and accurately. Some believe Vermeer may have used a camera obscura while composing the work: many optical effects typical of projection can be seen, in particular the blurring of the foreground. By rendering areas of the canvas as out-of-focus, Vermeer is able to suggest depth of field in a manner unusual for Dutch Baroque painting of the era but common in his interior works starting as early as 1657 in Girl Reading a Letter at an Open Window.

In The Lacemaker, the red and white of the lace is spilling from the sewing cushion in a near-liquid form, contrasting sharply with the precision of the lace she is shown working on.

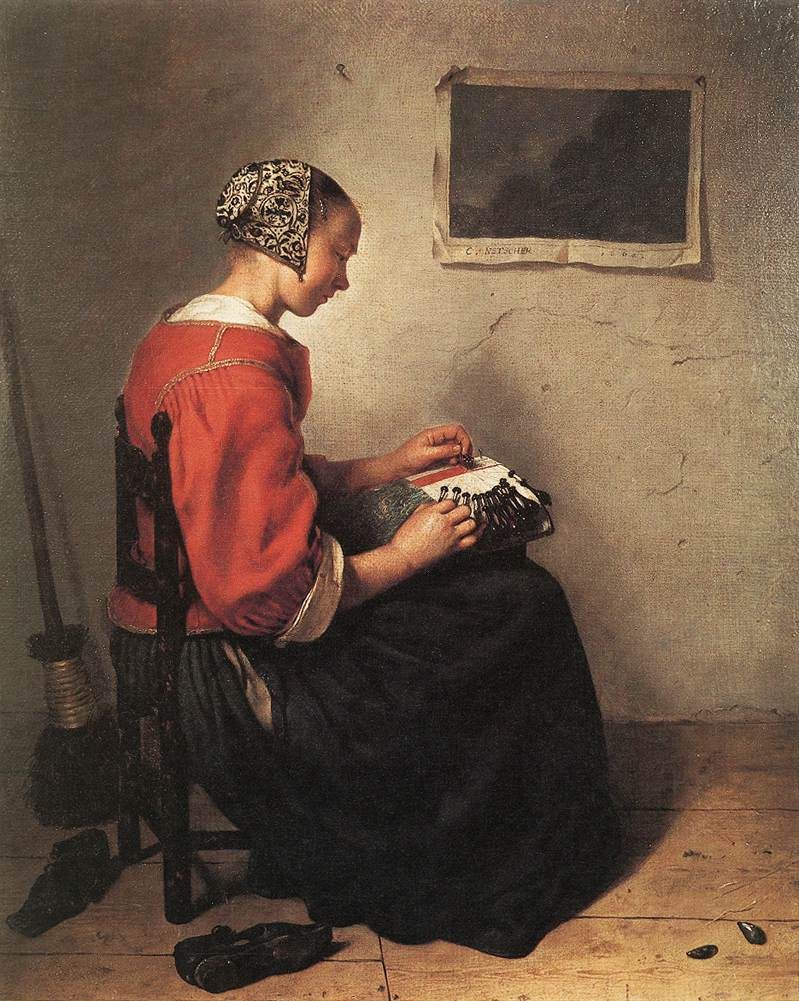
The Lace Maker (1662) by Caspar Netscher

According to the art historian Lawrence Gowing,

"The achievement of Vermeer's maturity is complete. It is not open to extension: no universal style is discovered. We have never the sense of abundance that the characteristic jewels of his century gives us, the sense that the precious vein lies open, ready to be worked. There is only one 'Lacemaker': we cannot imagine another. It is a complete and single definition."

The painting is often compared to a 1662 canvas by the Dutch portrait and genre painter Caspar Netscher, which is similarly contemplative in tone.

== Legacy ==
Salvador Dalí admired Vermeer and painted his own version of The Lacemaker in 1955, probably on commission by Robert Lehman, and around the same time The Paranoiac-Critical Study of Vermeer’s Lacemaker.

== See also ==
- List of paintings by Johannes Vermeer

== Sources ==
- Bonafoux, Pascal. Vermeer. New York: Konecky & Konecky, 1992. ISBN 1-56852-308-4
- Gowing, Lawrence. Vermeer. University of California Press, 1950.
- Huerta, Robert D. Giants of Delft. Bucknell University Press, 2003. ISBN 0-8387-5538-0
- Huerta, Robert D. Vermeer and Plato: Painting the Ideal. Bucknell University Press, 2005. ISBN 0-8387-5606-9
- Wheelock, Arthur K. Vermeer: The Complete Works. New York: Harry N. Abrams, 1997. ISBN 0-8109-2751-9
