= Woman Stroking a Parrot =

Painting by Eugène Delacroix

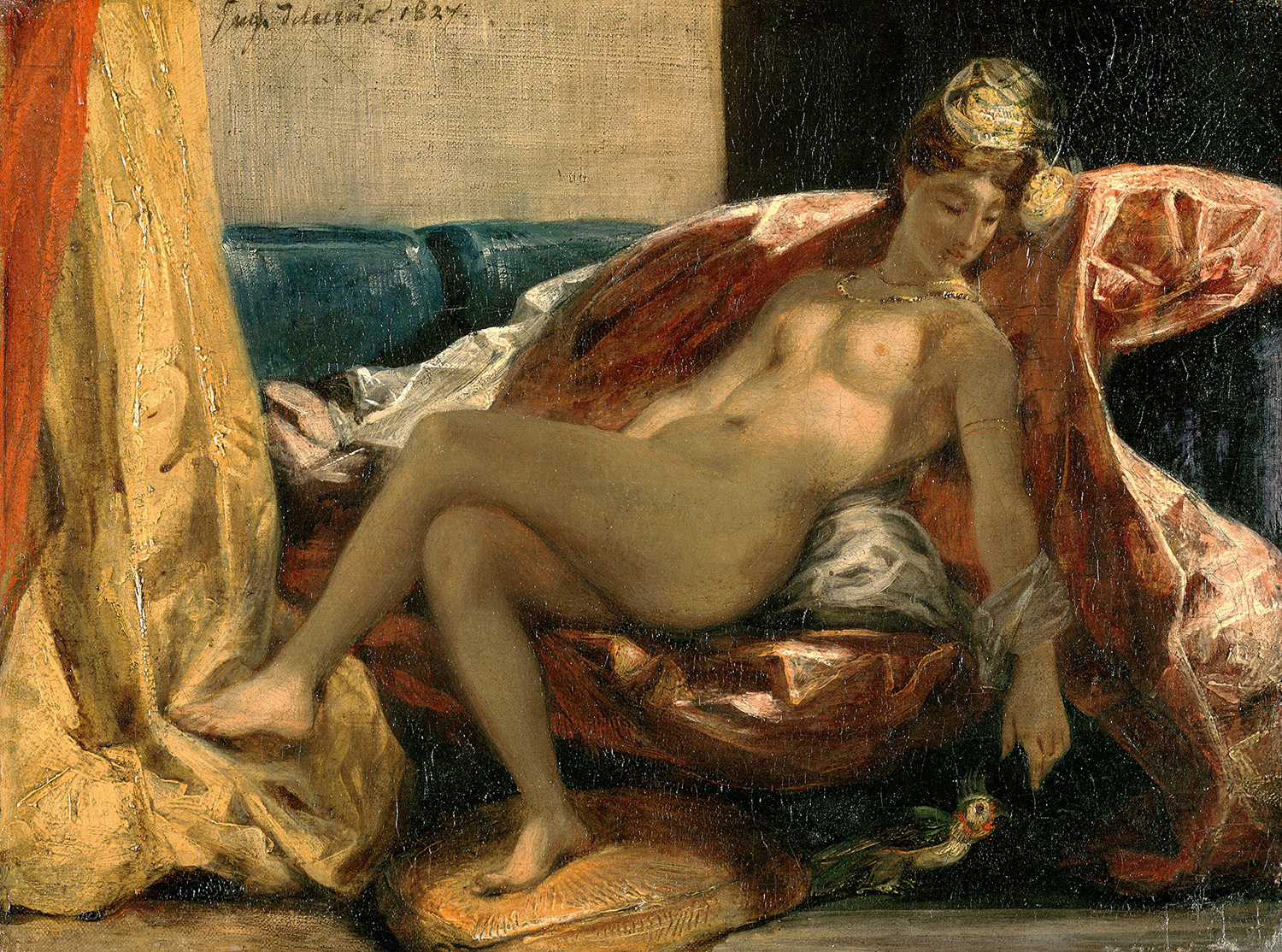
Woman Stroking a Parrot (1827) by Eugène Delacroix

Woman Stroking a Parrot (French - Femme caressant un perroquet) or Woman with a Parrot (Femme au perroquet or Femme avec un perroquet) is an 1827 Orientalist oil-on-canvas painting by Eugène Delacroix. Several art historians have linked the work to Lambert Sustris's Venus and Cupid. In 1897 the painting was given by Couturier de Royas to the Museum of Fine Arts of Lyon, where it still hangs.

Delacroix had suffered a sentimental or sensual crisis between 1825 and 1827 which led him to paint many more or less erotic works – according to his private journal from the time, completing the paintings was thus intertwined with the sexual satisfaction before the young model went away.

The model for this work may be Mademoiselle Laure, who also appears in the same artist's The Death of Sardanapalus and Greece Among the Ruins of Missolonghi, both dating to the same time. Another possibility is Rose, another of his models.
