= Olivier van Deuren =

Dutch painter

- Born: 21 December 1666; Rotterdam
- Died: 10 February 1714 (aged 47); Rotterdam

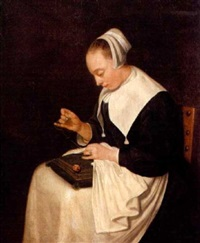
A young woman sewing, c.1700

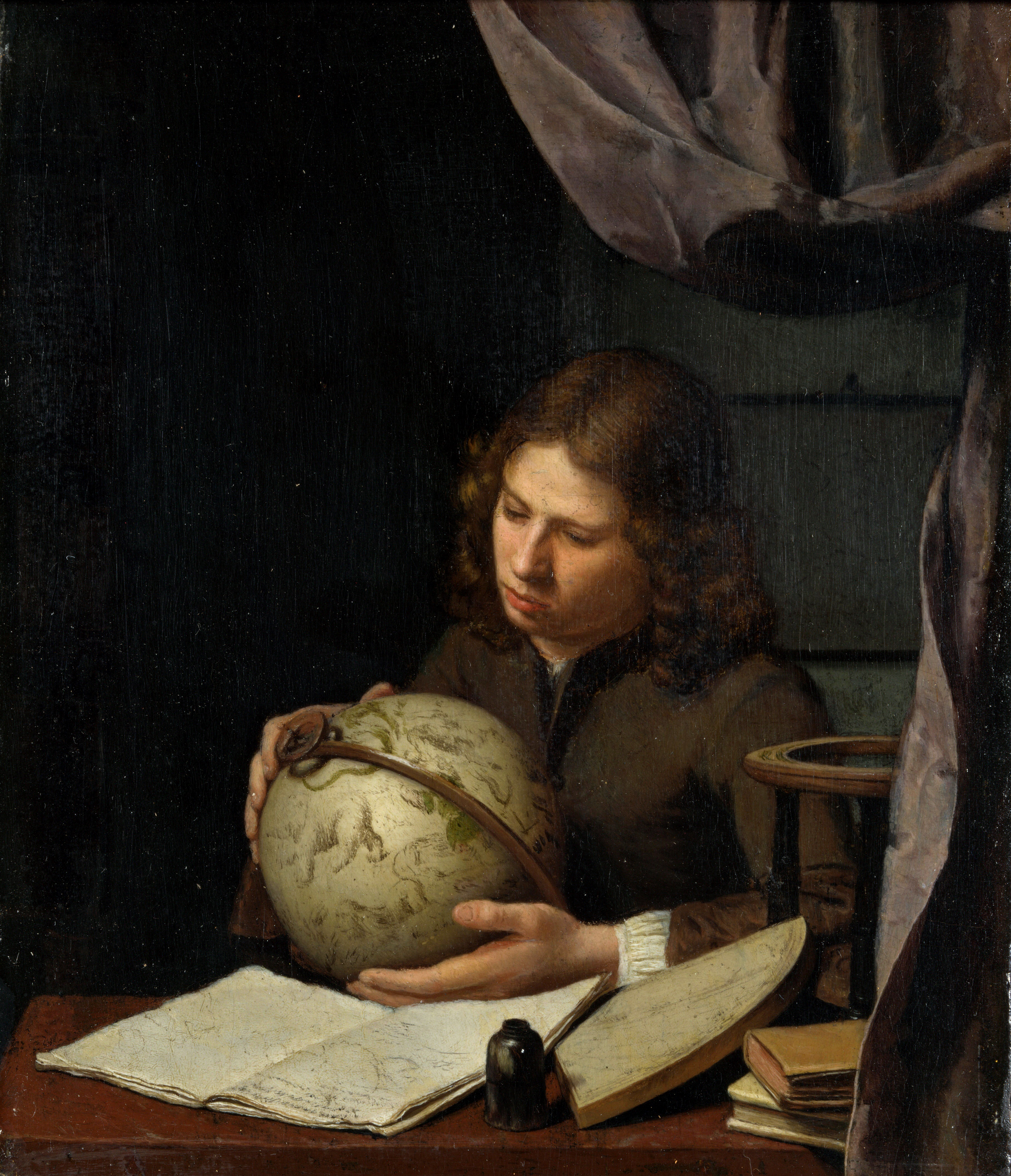
A Young Astronomer by Olivier Van Deuren, 1685

Olivier van Deuren or Olivier Pietersz. van Deuren; Olivier van Dueren; Olivier van Durren (December 21, 1666 – February 10, 1714) was a painter from the Dutch Republic.

Deuren was born in Rotterdam and became a pupil of Peter Lely, Frans van Mieris the Elder and Caspar Netscher. He is known for genre works and figure studies.

Deuren died in Rotterdam.
