= George Salting =

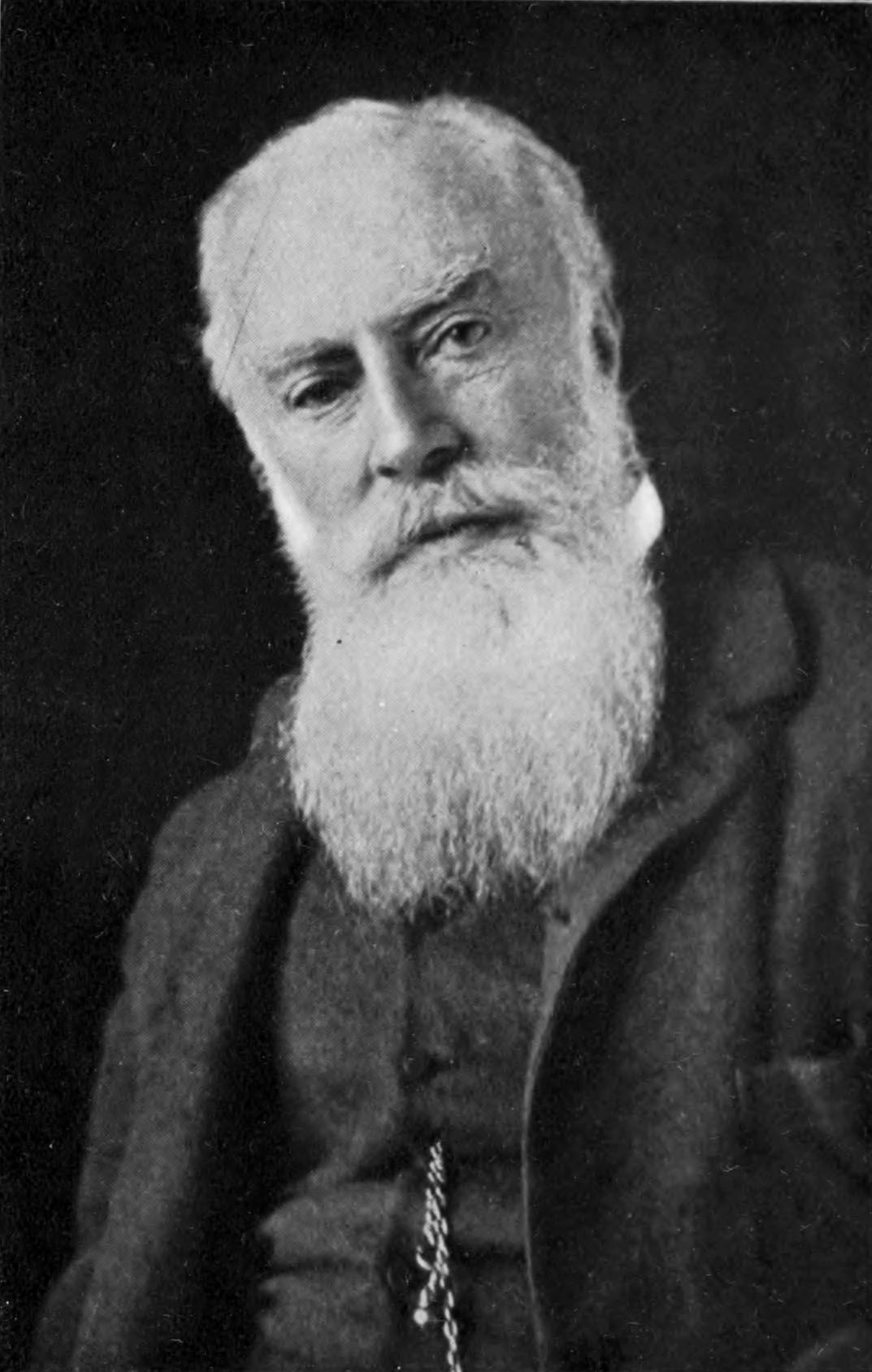
- George Salting
- Born: 15 August 1835; Sydney, Colony of New South Wales
- Died: 12 December 1909 (aged 74); London, England
- Resting place: Brompton Cemetery
- Occupation: Art collector

George Salting (15 August 1835 – 12 December 1909) was a Colony of New South Wales-born British art collector. He had inherited considerable wealth from his father; Salting collected paintings, Chinese porcelains, furniture, and many other categories of art and decorative items. He left his paintings to the National Gallery, London, prints and drawings to the British Museum, and the remainder to the Victoria & Albert Museum, requesting that the collection be displayed intact rather than divided among the museum's departments.

== Early life ==
Salting was born in Sydney, the son of Severin Kanute (Knud) Salting (1806–1865), a Dane who had extensive business interests in New South Wales. George Salting's mother was Louisa Augusta, née Fiellerup.

George Salting was educated locally and then moved with his family to England and studied at Eton College. In 1853 the family returned to New South Wales, and Salting entered the newly founded University of Sydney. Salting graduated with a Bachelor of Arts degree in 1857. In 1858 the Salting family again travelled to England; Louisa Salting died there on 24 July 1858. Severin Salting settled in Kent, where he died in 1865. Severin Salting made a large fortune in sheep-farming and sugar-growing which he bequeathed to his son; George Salting inherited a fortune estimated at £30,000 a year.

== Legacy ==
Salting left his entire collection of paintings, Oriental china, bronzes, and miniatures, valued at from $5,000,000 to $20,000,000, to British museums.

John D. Beazley named after an attic red-figure vase formerly owned by George Salting today in the Victoria and Albert Museum, Salting Painter.

== Collection ==
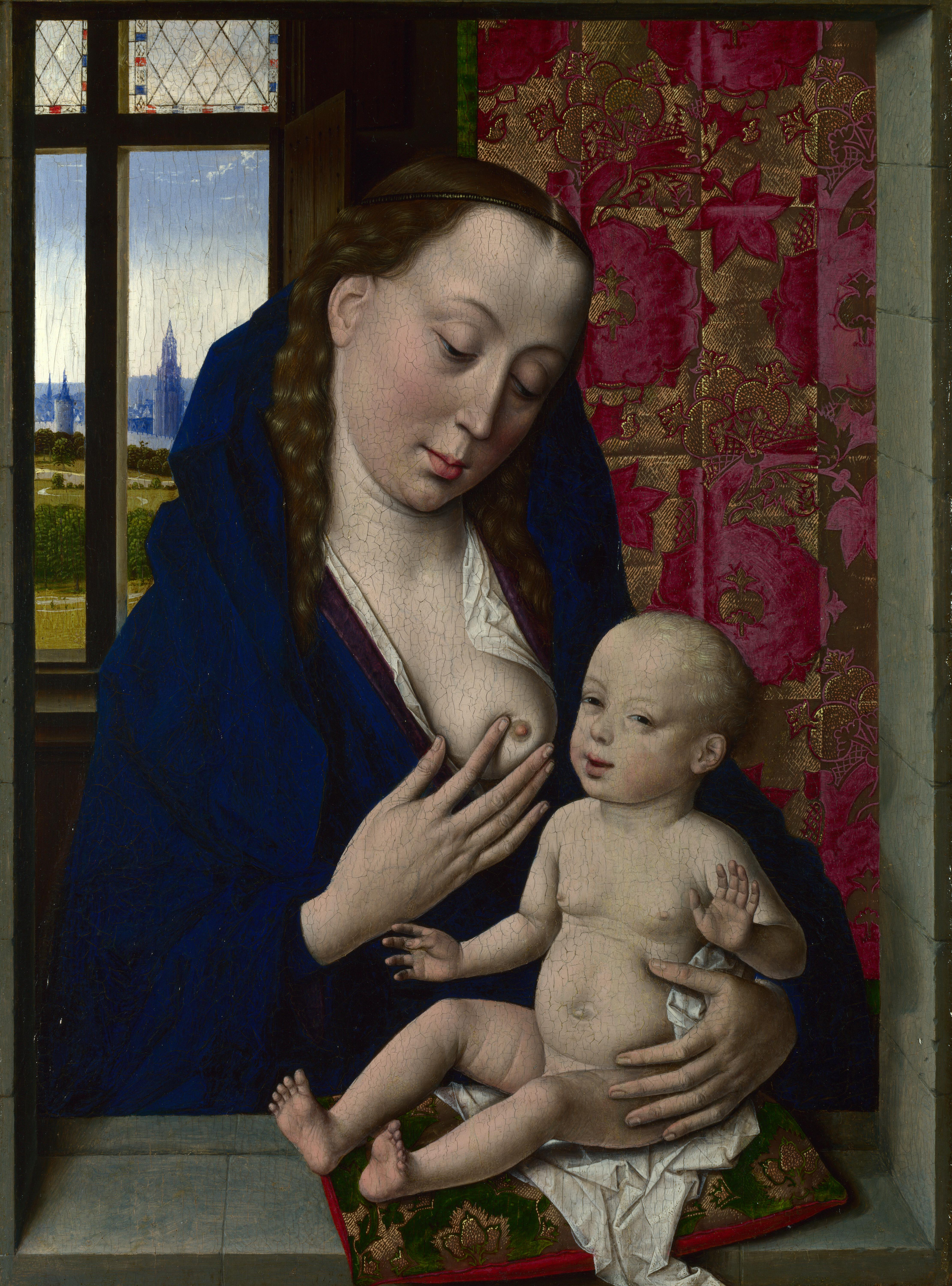
Dieric Bouts, Virgin and Child

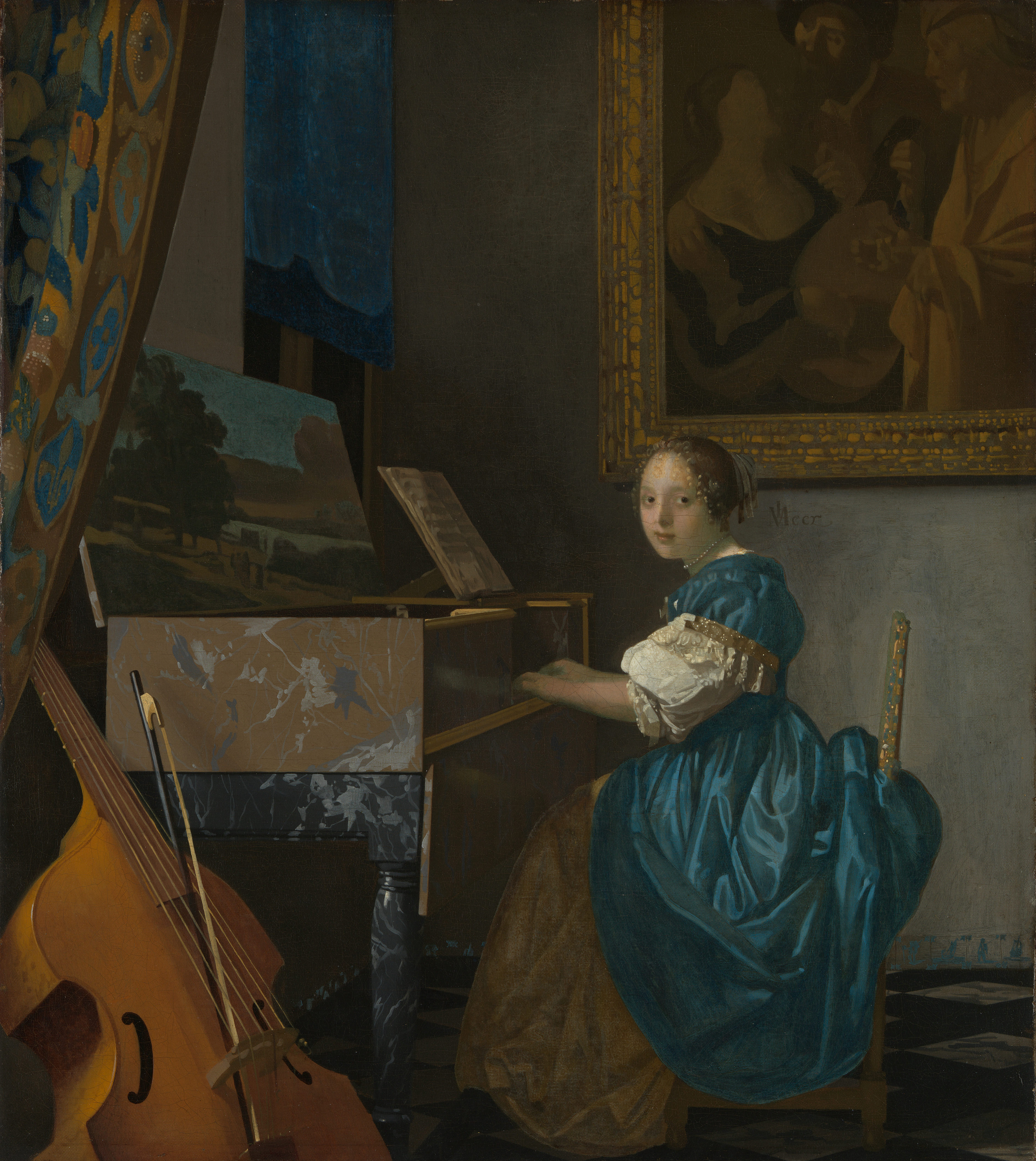
Johannes Vermeer, Lady Seated at a Virginal

He gave three paintings to the National Gallery during his life, and bequeathed an additional 192 in his will. Of those 31 have since been transferred to the Tate Gallery. His collection of paintings included:

- Dieric Bouts, Virgin and Child
- Robert Campin (follower), The Virgin and Child before a Firescreen
- Canaletto, Venice: The Piazza San Marco from Two Views of Piazza San Marco
- Petrus Christus, Portrait of a Young Man
- Cima da Conegliano, David and Jonathan (?) and The Virgin and Child
- Joos van Cleve, The Holy Family
- John Constable, Salisbury Cathedral and Leadenhall from the River Avon and Weymouth Bay: Bowleaze Cove and Jordon Hill
- Jean-Baptiste-Camille Corot, A Wagon in the Plains of Artois, The Wood Gatherer, The Leaning Tree Trunk, Evening on the Lake, Cows in a Marshy Landscape, Souvenir of a Journey to Coubron, and A Flood
- Charles-François Daubigny, River Scene with Ducks, The Garden Wall, Willows and Alders
- Gaspard Dughet, Landscape with a Cowherd
- Domenico Ghirlandaio, Portrait of a Young Man in Red
- Jan van Goyen, A Windmill by a River, A River Scene, with Fishermen laying a Net and A Scene on the Ice
- Frans Hals, Portrait of a Woman with a Fan and Portrait of a Man holding Gloves
- Meindert Hobbema, Cottages in a Wood and A Road winding past Cottages
- Hans Memling, A Young Man at Prayer
- Gabriël Metsu, The Interior of a Smithy and An Old Woman with a Book
- Jean-François Millet, The Whisper
- Adriaen van Ostade, A Peasant holding a Jug and a Pipe, A Peasant courting an Elderly Woman and The Interior of an Inn
- Sebastiano del Piombo, The Daughter of Herodias
- Paulus Potter, Cattle and Sheep in a Stormy Landscape
- Francesco Raibolini, Bartolomeo Bianchini
- Théodore Rousseau, Sunset in the Auvergne
- Peter Paul Rubens, Aurora abducting Cephalus
- Jacob Isaakszoon van Ruisdael, A Cottage and a Hayrick by a River, A Rocky Hill with Three Cottages, a Stream at its Foot, Vessels in a Fresh Breeze, A Road leading into a Wood, A Ruined Castle Gateway and An Extensive Landscape with Ruins
- Luca Signorelli, The Holy Family
- Jan Steen, Peasants merry-making outside an Inn, A Man blowing Smoke at a Drunken Woman, An Interior with a Man offering an Oyster to a Woman, Skittle Players outside an Inn, A Peasant Family at Meal-time ('Grace before Meat') and A Pedlar selling Spectacles outside a Cottage
- Johannes Vermeer, Lady Seated at a Virginal
- Andrea del Verrocchio, The Virgin and Child with Two Angels

Some of the artifacts bequeathed by Salting, now in the Victoria and Albert Museum, London

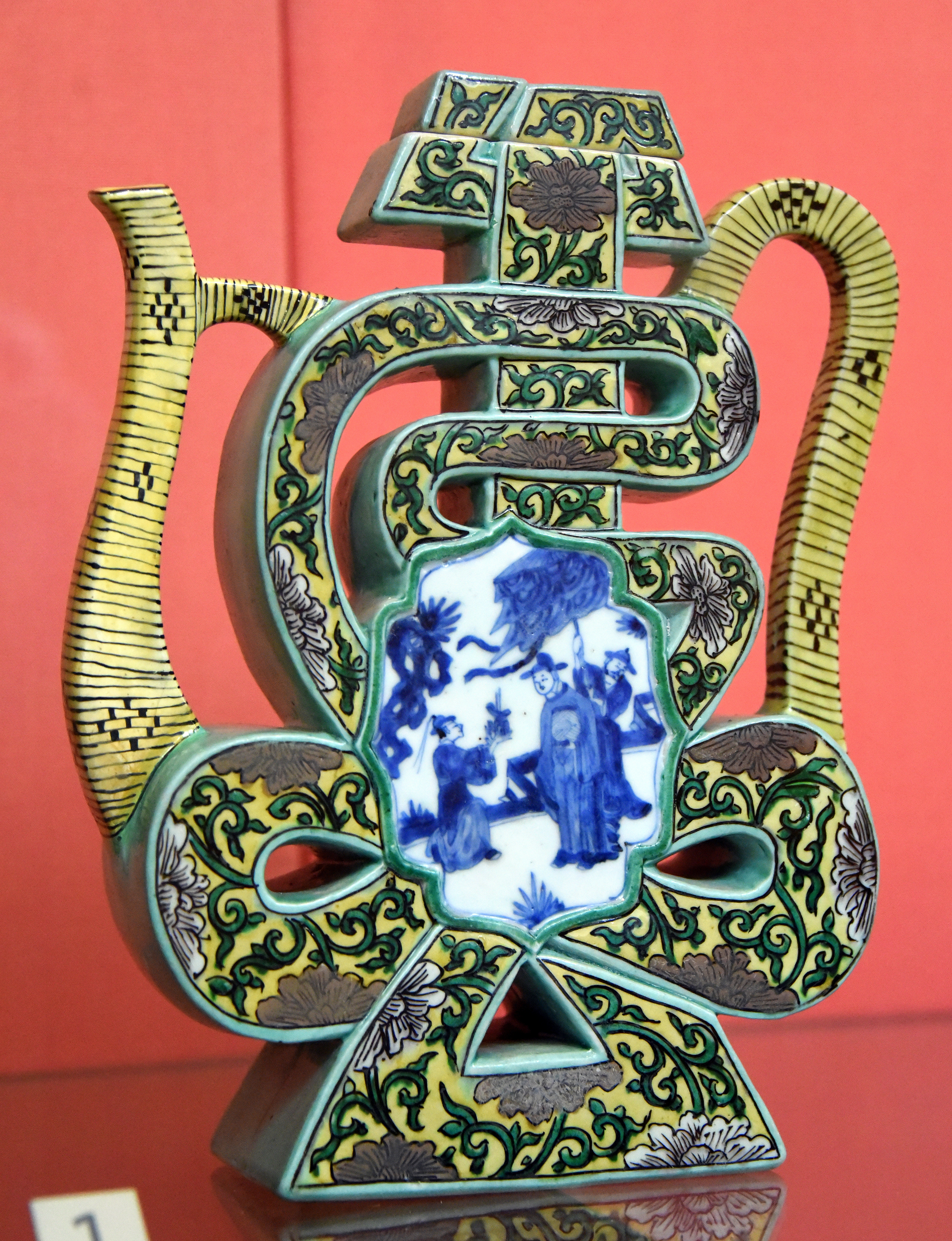
Wine pot in the shape of Shou character. Qing dynasty, Kangxi reign period, 1680–1720 CE. Porcelain painted in underglaze cobalt blue and overglaze colored enamels. From Jingdezhen, China

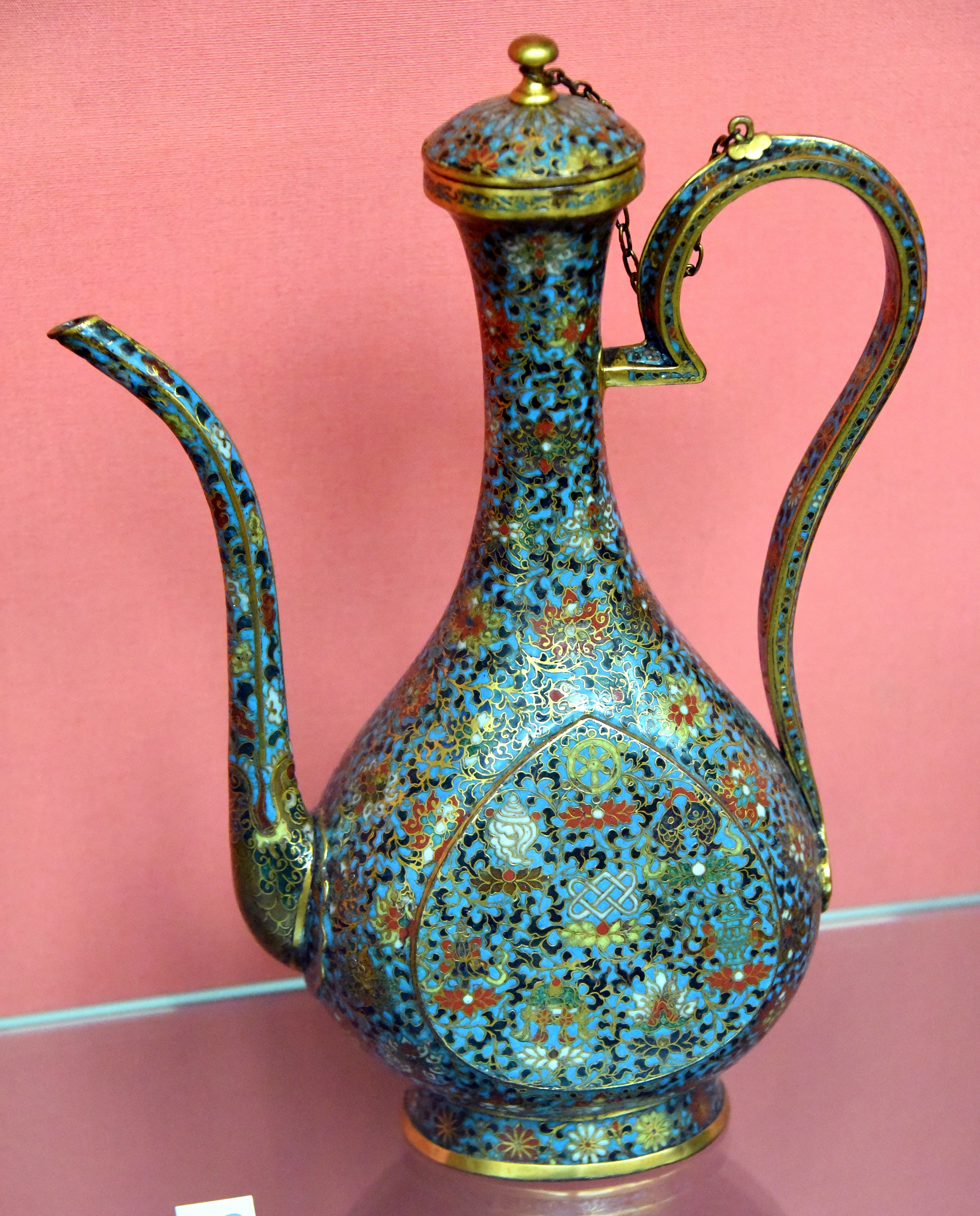
Lidded ewer. Wine pot with floral design; the body decorated with the "Eight Auspicious Symbols" amidst scrolling flowers. Cloisonne enamel on copper. Ming dynasty, 1550–1600 CE. From China

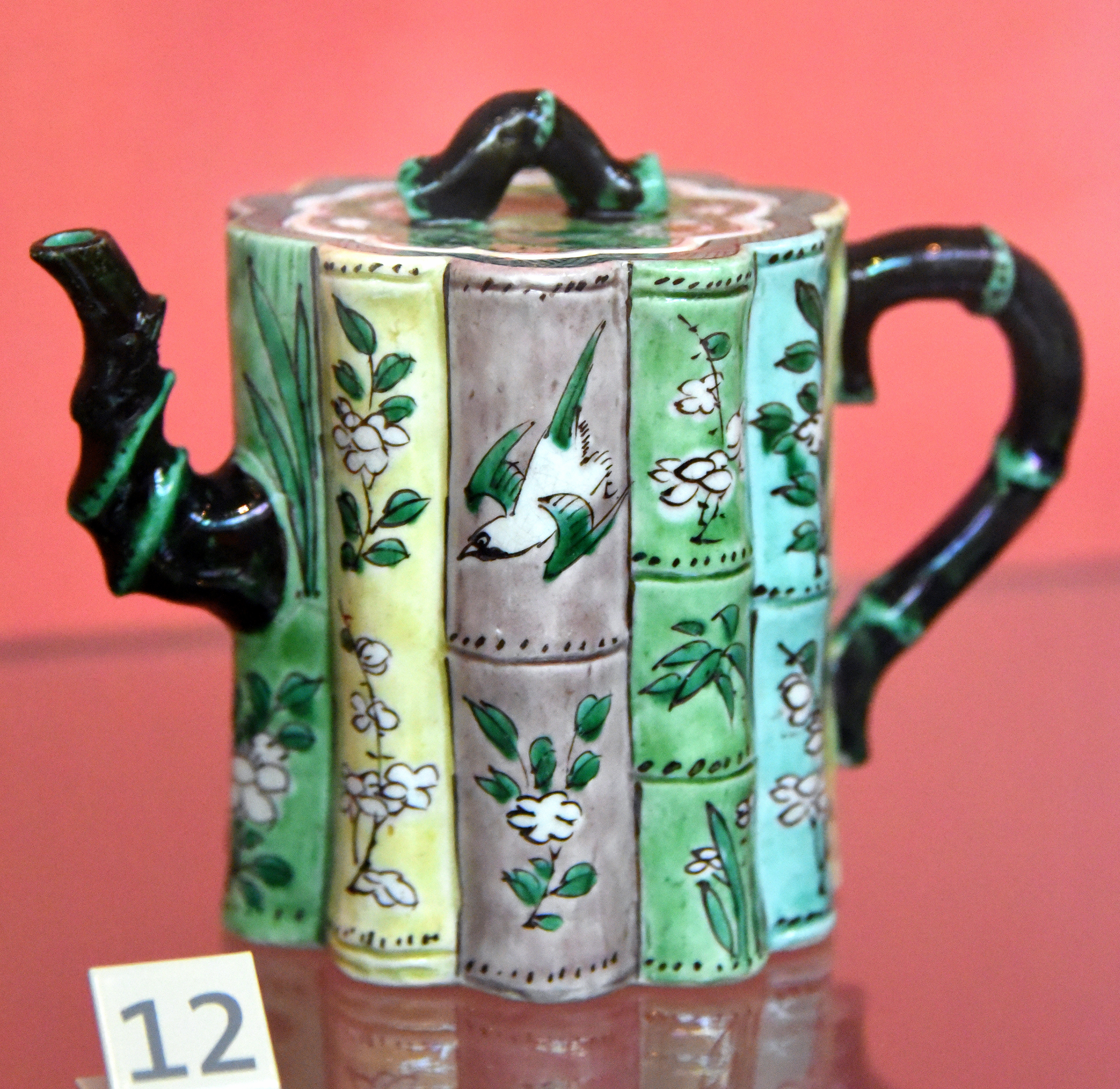
Teapot. Porcelain painted in colored enamels. Qing dynasty, Kangxi reign period, 1680–1720 CE. From China, Jingdezhen
