= Lady Standing at a Virginal =

Painting by Johannes Vermeer

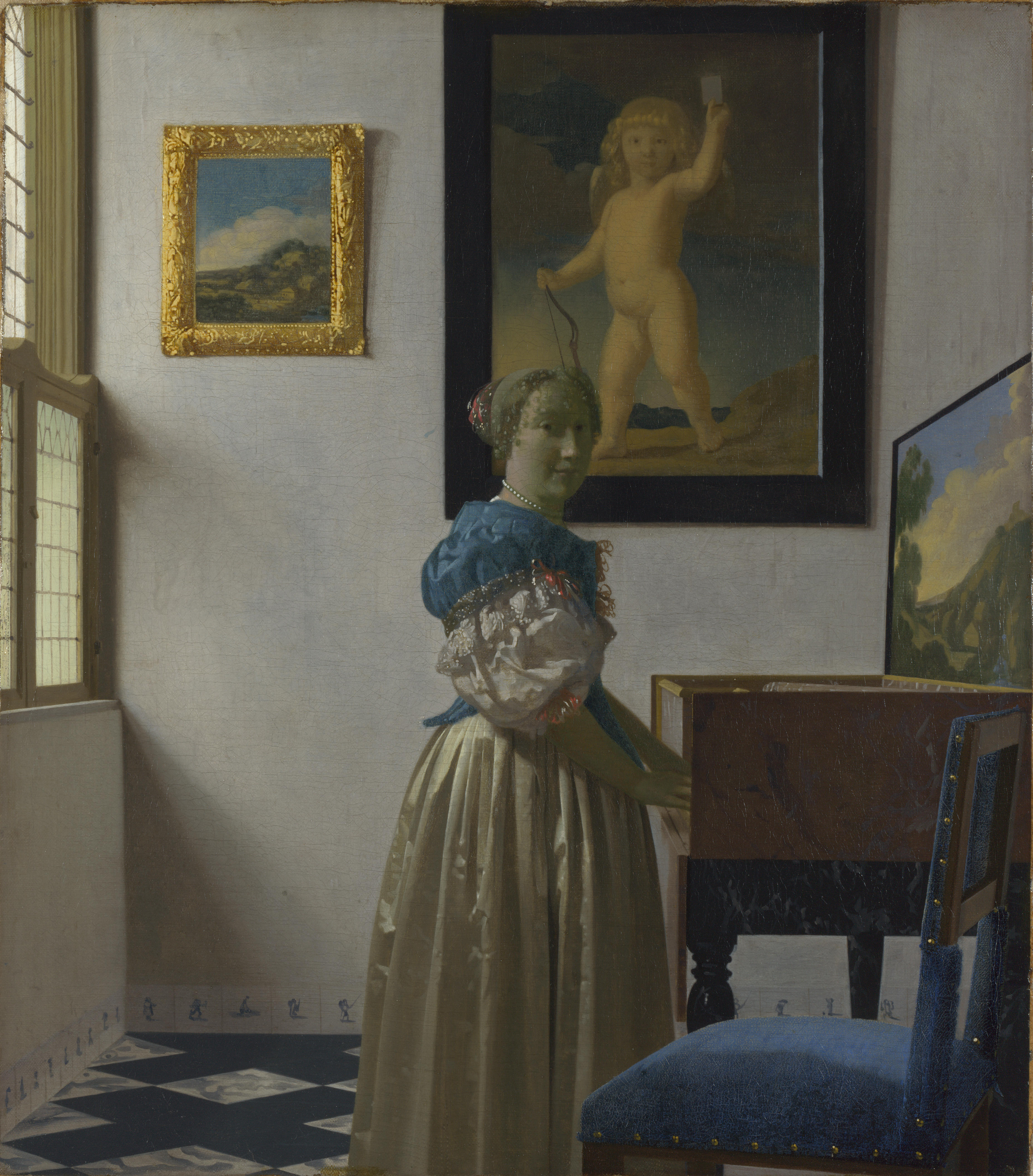
- Artist: Johannes Vermeer
- Year: c. 1670–1672
- Medium: Oil on canvas
- Movement: Dutch Golden Age painting
- Dimensions: 51.7 cm × 45.2 cm (20.4 in × 17.8 in)
- Location: National Gallery, London

Lady Standing at a Virginal is a genre painting created by the Dutch artist Johannes Vermeer in about 1670–1672, now in the National Gallery, London.

== Description ==
The oil painting depicts a richly dressed woman playing a virginal in a home with a tiled floor, paintings on the wall and some of the locally manufactured Delftware blue and white tiles of a type that appear in other Vermeer works.

The identities of the paintings on the wall are not certain, according to the National Gallery, but the landscape on the left may be by either Jan Wijnants or Allart van Everdingen. The second painting, showing Cupid holding a card, is attributed to Caesar van Everdingen, Allart's brother. This motif originated in a contemporary emblem and may either represent the idea of faithfulness to a single lover or, perhaps, reflect the presence of the virginal, the traditional association of music and love.

The painting has been dated on stylistic grounds and on the evidence of the costume. This work can be related to another Vermeer in the collection, Lady Seated at a Virginal, on a canvas of almost exactly the same size, with which it may form a pair. A recent study has shown that the canvas for the two paintings came from the same bolt. In addition, the ground applied to the canvas of each painting appears to be identical and also to be shared with the New York Young Woman Seated at the Virginals.

The painting is depicted in David Hockney's 1977 oil painting Looking at Pictures on a Screen.

== See also ==
- Young Woman Seated at a Virginal
- List of paintings by Johannes Vermeer
- Dutch Golden Age painting
