= Noli me tangere (Sustris) =

Painting by Lambert Sustris

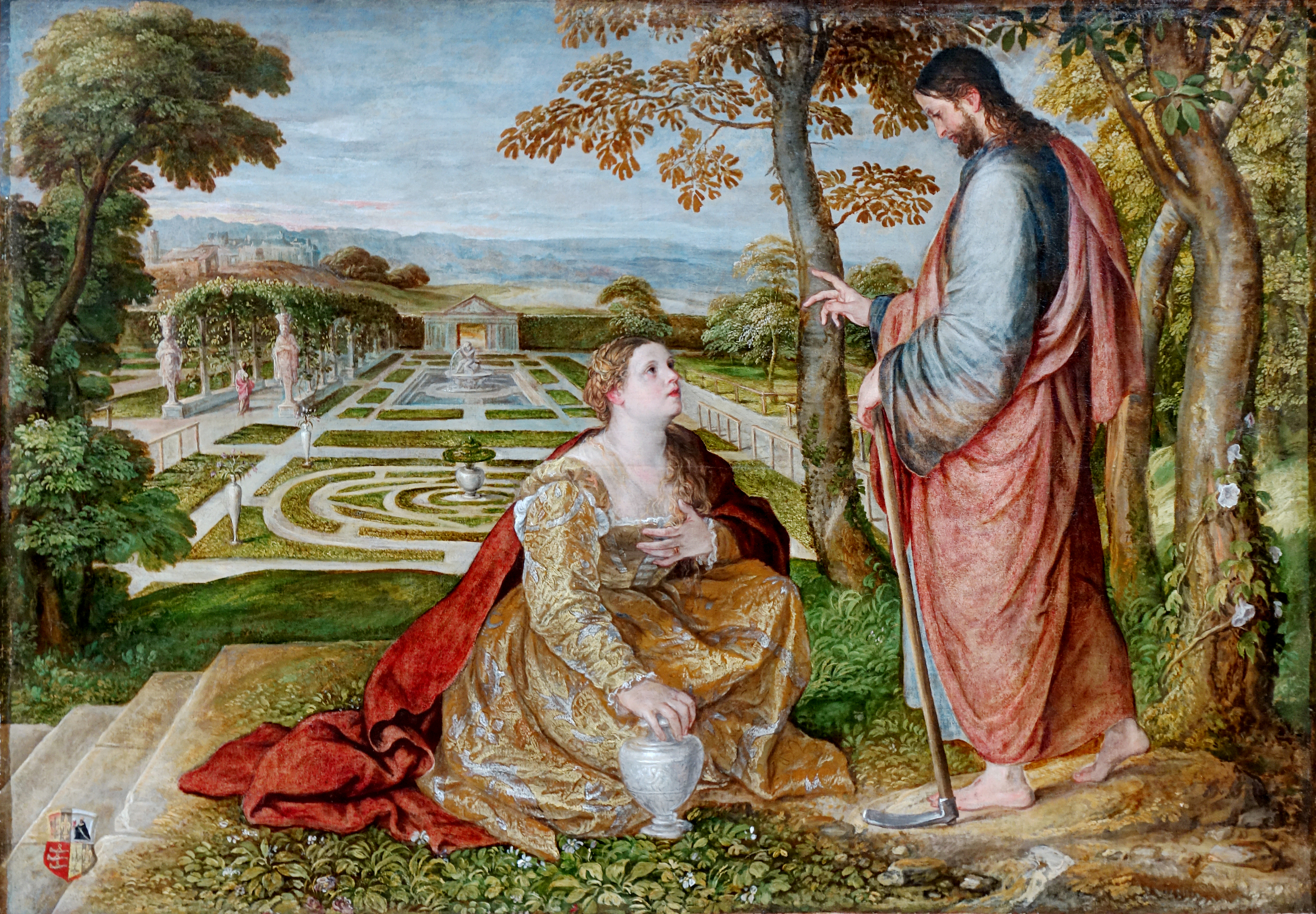
- Artist: Lambert Sustris
- Year: between 1548 and 1560
- Medium: Oil on canvas
- Dimensions: 136 cm × 196 cm (54 in × 77 in)
- Location: Palais des beaux-arts, Lille
- Website: Catalogue page

Noli me tangere or Christ Appearing As A Gardener To Mary Magdalene is a 1548-1560 painting by the Flemish painter Lambert Sustris. It is now in the Palais des beaux-arts de Lille.

It shows the eponymous scene from the Gospel of John, set in a Renaissance-style garden with geometric parterres, a fountain, a covered passageway and a cloister. Wearing a sumptuous gold and silver damask robe, Mary Magdalene kneels before Christ, holding her left hand to her breast and her right on an alabaster vase. He leans on a hoe and points to the sky, whilst a white bindweed around the trunk of the tree behind him symbolises the fall of sin. A woman's shadow stretches along the passageway, possibly symbolising Mary's spreading the news of the Resurrection to the Twelve Apostles.

== History ==
It was produced during Sustris' first or second stay in Augsburg, probably for count Fugger of Kirschberg and Weissenhorn, whose coat of arms are in the bottom left of the work. Around the time of his stay there the artist assimilated the Italian style and combined the Venetian style with the mannerism of Francesco Salviati and Parmigianino. This and other works of that period by him show the influence of Titian, with whom Sustris had collaborated since 1540, and anticipated Paolo Veronese's 1560s compositions.

It was then acquired by a rich banker and collector, Everhard Jabach, who sold it to Louis XIV in 1671. Louis put it in the Salon des Bassans at the château de Versailles, near the entrance to his bedroom. After the Chaptal Decree of 1801 the French state assigned the painting (then attributed to Dosso Dossi) to the museum in Lille. It was re-attributed to Sustris between 1801 and 1835.
