= Lady Seated at a Virginal =

1670–1672 painting by Johannes Vermeer

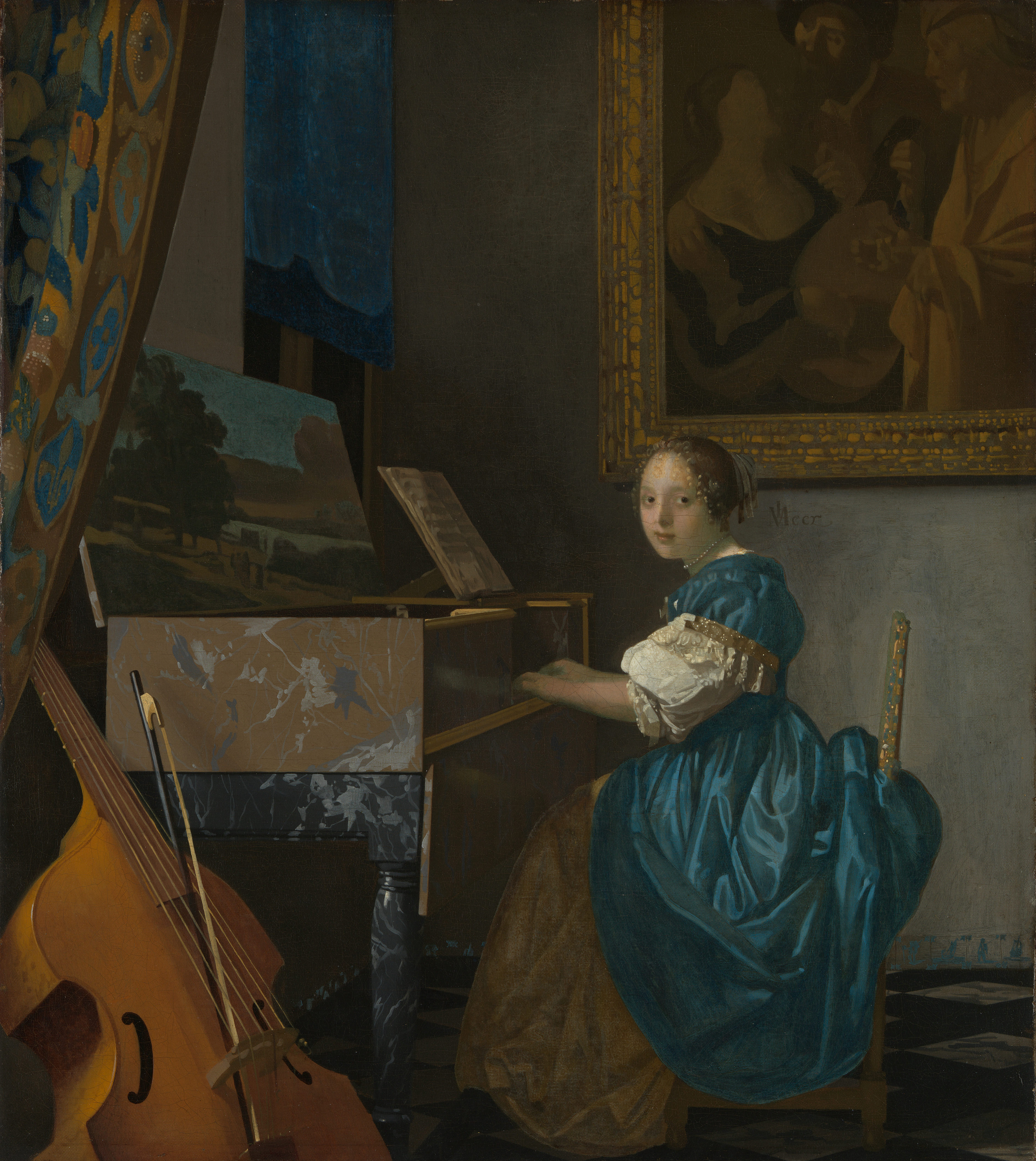
- Artist: Johannes Vermeer
- Year: c. 1670–1672
- Medium: Oil on canvas
- Movement: Dutch Golden Age painting
- Dimensions: 51.5 cm × 45.5 cm (20.3 in × 17.9 in)
- Location: National Gallery; London

Lady Seated at a Virginal (Dutch: Zittende virginaalspeelster), also known as Young Woman Seated at a Virginal, is a genre painting created by the Dutch Golden Age painter Johannes Vermeer in about 1670–1672 and now in the National Gallery, London.

== Lady Seated at a Virginal ==
Another painting, probably also by Johannes Vermeer and known as A Young Woman Seated at the Virginals, also shows a young woman seated at a virginal. That painting and the Lady Seated at a Virginal are quite separate works. As each is also known by alternate names, the two may be confused with one another.

== Description ==
The picture shows a woman facing left and playing a virginal. In the left foreground is a viola da gamba holding a bow between its strings. A landscape is painted on the inside lid of the virginal, and the painting on the wall is either the original or a copy of The Procuress by Dirck van Baburen (c. 1622, now in the Museum of Fine Arts in Boston), which belonged to Vermeer's mother-in-law. The painting is 51.5 by 45.5 centimetres (20.3 in × 17.9 in).

== Commentary ==
Because of its style, the painting has been dated to about 1670. It has been suggested that it and Lady Standing at a Virginal (also owned by the National Gallery) may have been created as pendants, because their sizes, date and subject matter are all similar. A recent study has shown that the canvas for the two paintings also came from the same bolt. In addition, the ground applied to the canvas appears identical to that used for both the Lady Standing and the New York Young Woman Seated. However their provenances before the 19th century differ, and Vermeer sometimes varied a theme in otherwise unrelated paintings. In the 19th century, both paintings were owned by the art critic Théophile Thoré, whose writings led to a resurgence of interest in Vermeer starting in 1866. The painting entered the National Gallery with the Salting Bequest in 1910.

The painting is one of several works by Vermeer featuring keyboard instruments, including The Music Lesson, The Concert, and Lady Standing at a Virginal. Scholars believe these may all be based on the same instrument, built by Johannes Ruckers.

== See also ==
- Dutch Golden Age painting
- List of paintings by Johannes Vermeer
