= Lambert Sustris =

Dutch painter

- Born: c. 1515–1520; Amsterdam
- Died: c. 1584 (aged c. 63–69); Venice (uncertain)
- Education: Maarten van Heemskerck or Jan van Scorel
- Known for: Painting
- Movement: Mannerism
- Patrons: Titian

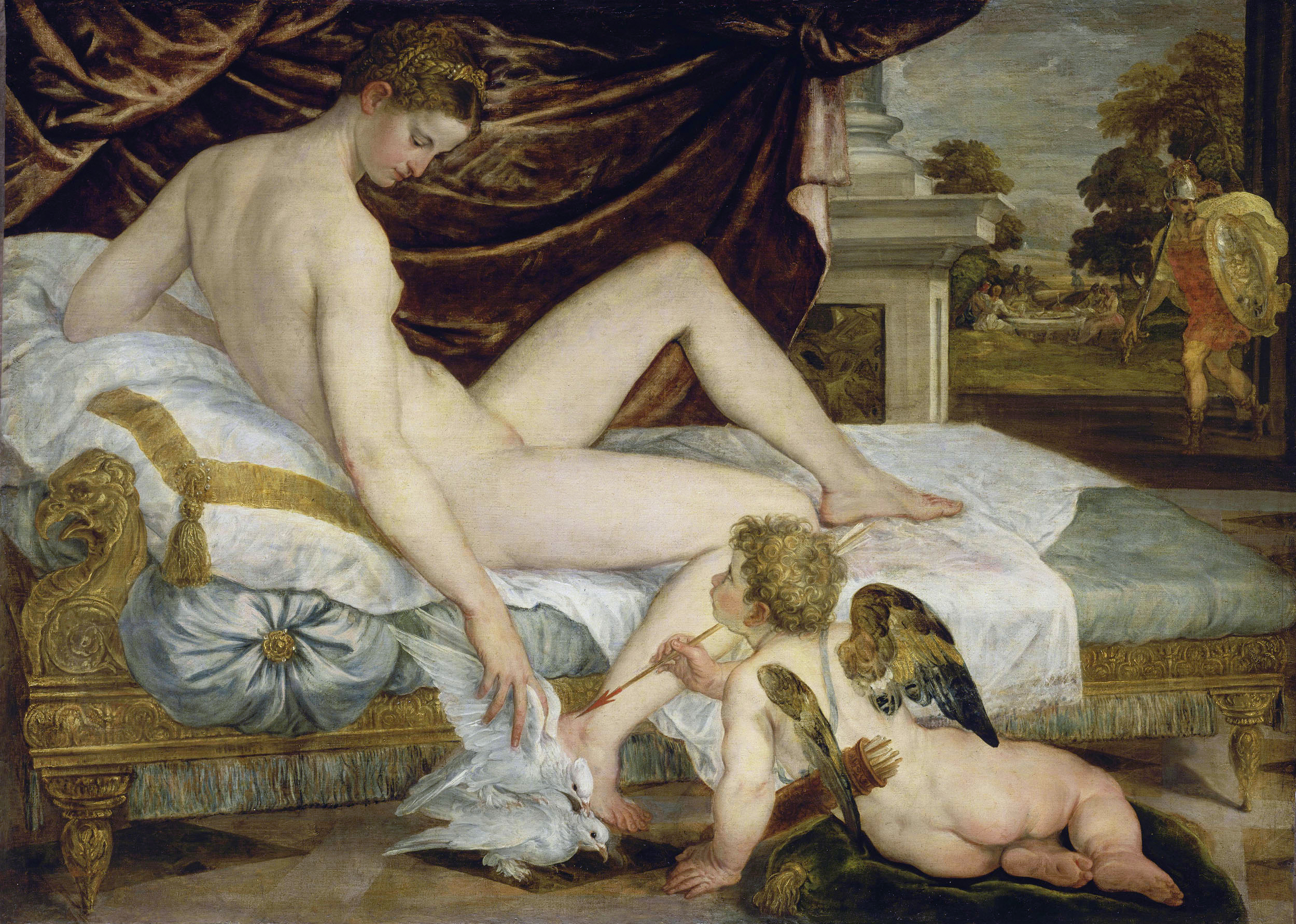
Lambert Sustris, Venus and Cupid, Louvre, 1554

Lambert Sustris (c. 1515/1520 – c. 1584) was a Dutch painter active mainly in Venice. The works Sustris completed in Italy exhibit either a Mannerist style or qualities that may be deemed proto-Baroque. He is also referred to as Alberto de Olanda (Albert of Holland). He was born in Amsterdam, and only came to Venice when over 40 years old. His training is unknown, but he was utilized by the studio of Titian for the depiction of landscapes. He accompanied Titian on his trips to Augsburg in 1548 and 1550–1551, and there executed portraits. Returning to Venice, he was influenced by Parmigianino and Andrea Meldolla.

His son was Friedrich Sustris, who he trained. Another pupil was Girolamo Muziano. As the Muziano scholar Patrizia Tosini has noted, Sustris's works, via his pupil Muziano, are a significant means by which a mid-sixteenth century Venetian interest in landscape and its role as a backdrop for historical subjects spread to Rome in the mid-to-late sixteenth century.

== Works ==
- Hermippe (between 1540 and 1565)
- Perseus and Andromeda (c. 1545)
- The Baptism of the Ethiopian Eunuch by the Deacon Philip (between 1545 and 1550)
- Noli me tangere (between 1548 and 1553), now at the Palais des Beaux-Arts de Lille
- Hans Christoph Vöhlin von Frickenhausen (1552)
- Judith with the head of Holofernes, oil on canvas, Palais des Beaux-Arts de Lille
- Jupiter and Io (between 1557 and 1563), Hermitage Museum, Saint Petersburg
- Otto von Waldburg (16th century)
- Pietà and Angels (16th century)
- Virgin and Child with Saint Anne and Infant Saint John (second half of the 16th century)
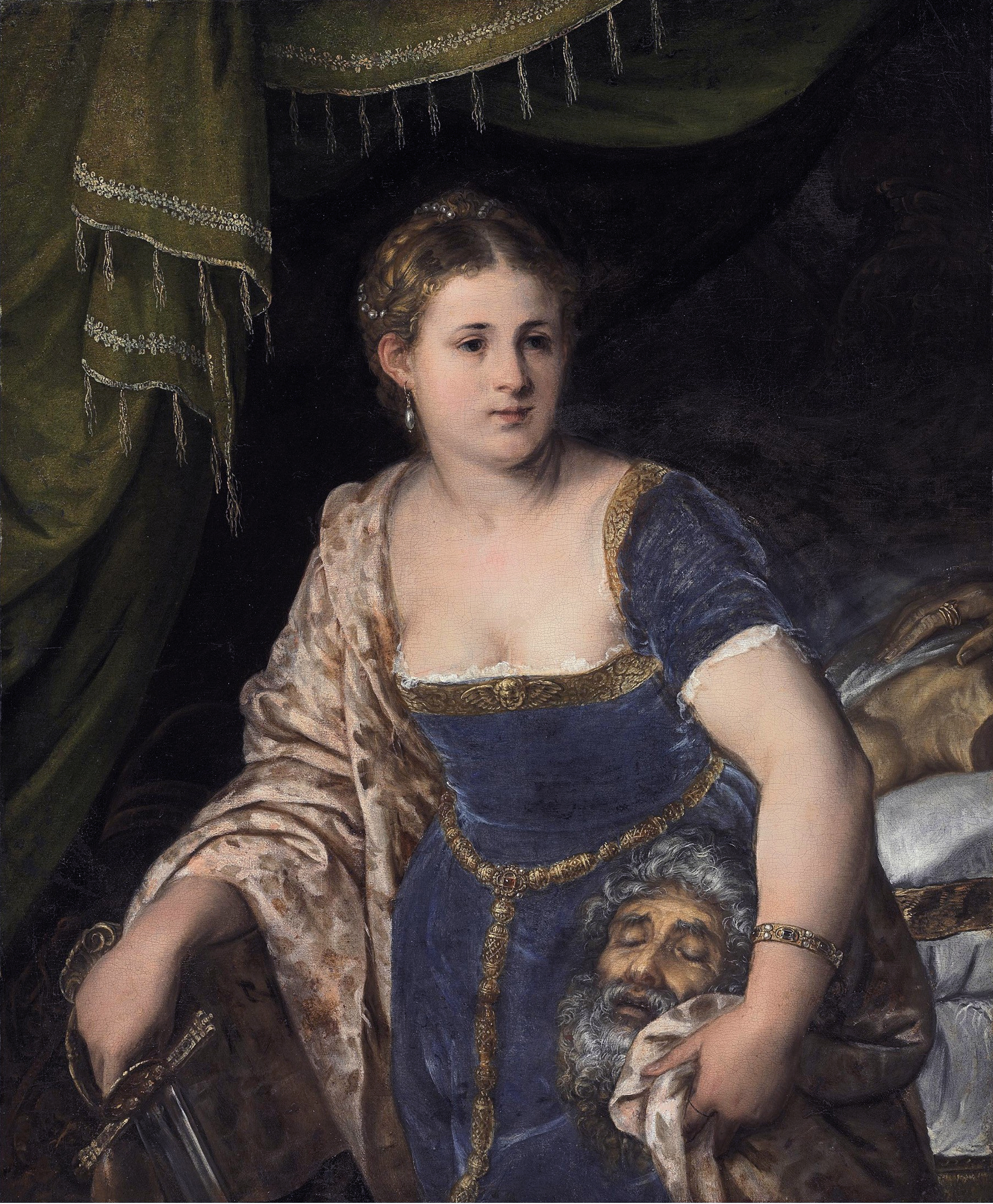
Judith with the Head of Holofernes

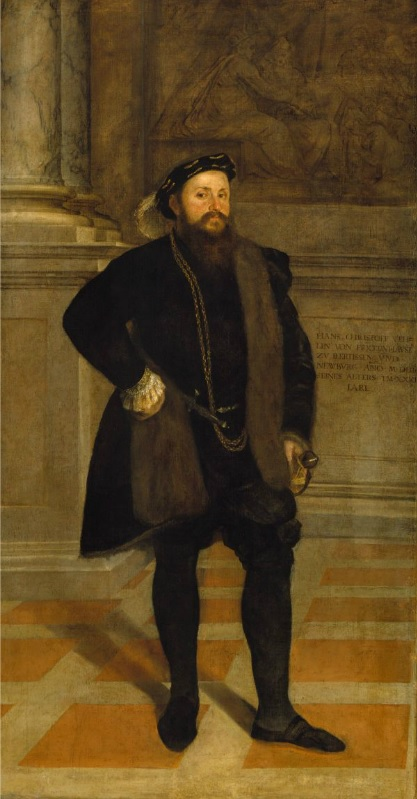
Hans Christoph Vöhlin von Frickenhausen

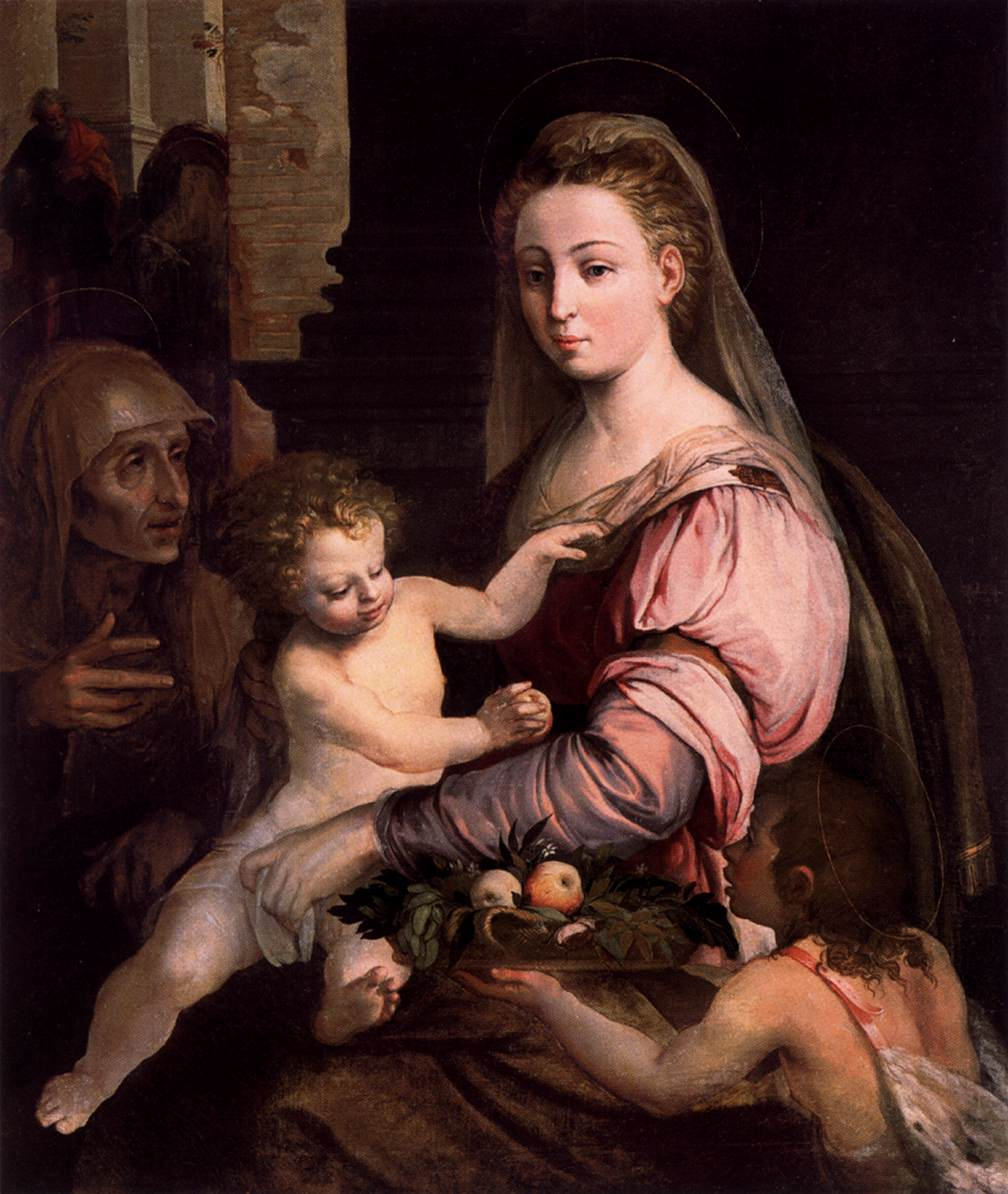
Virgin and Child with Saint Anne and the Infant Saint John
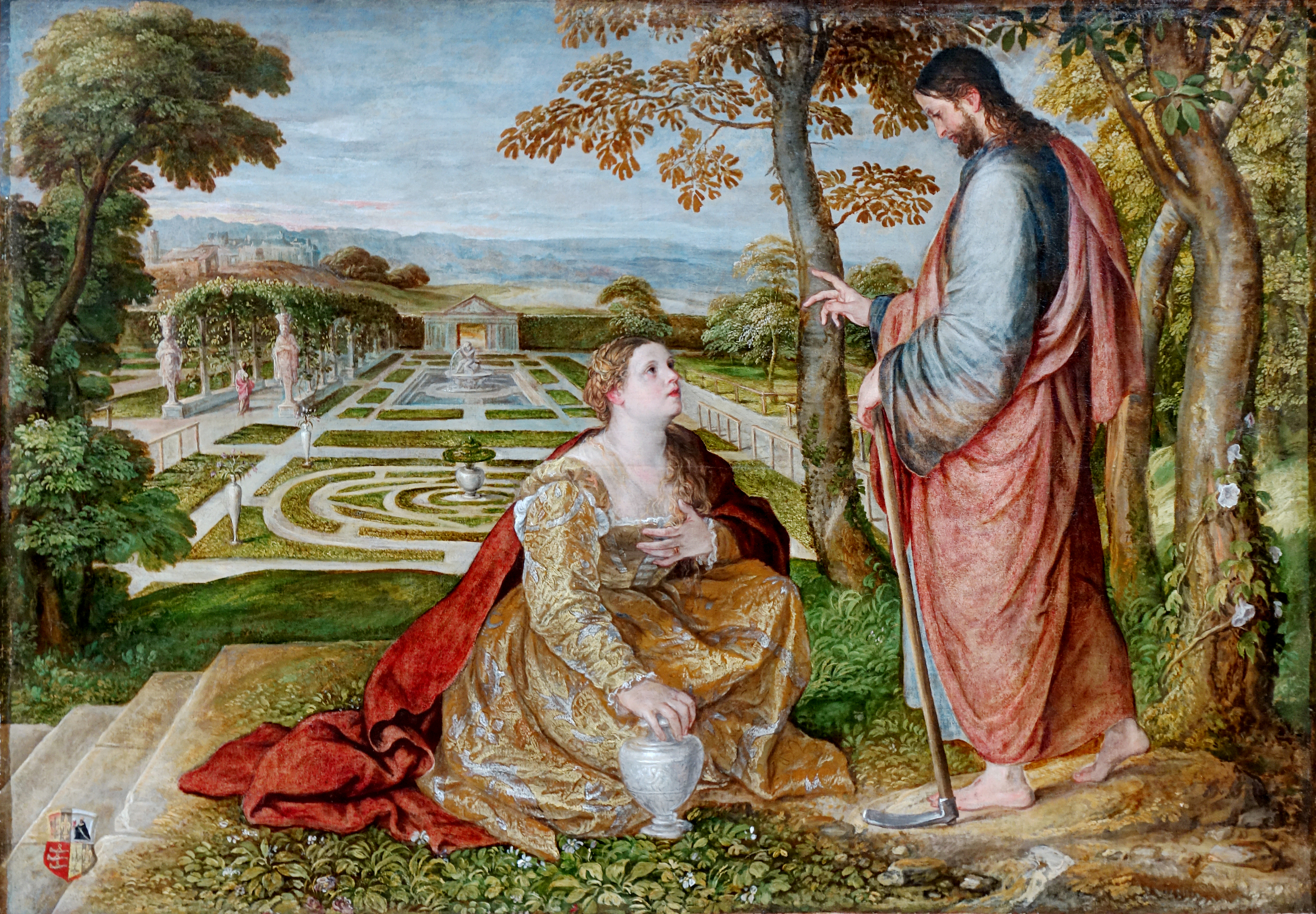
Noli me tangere

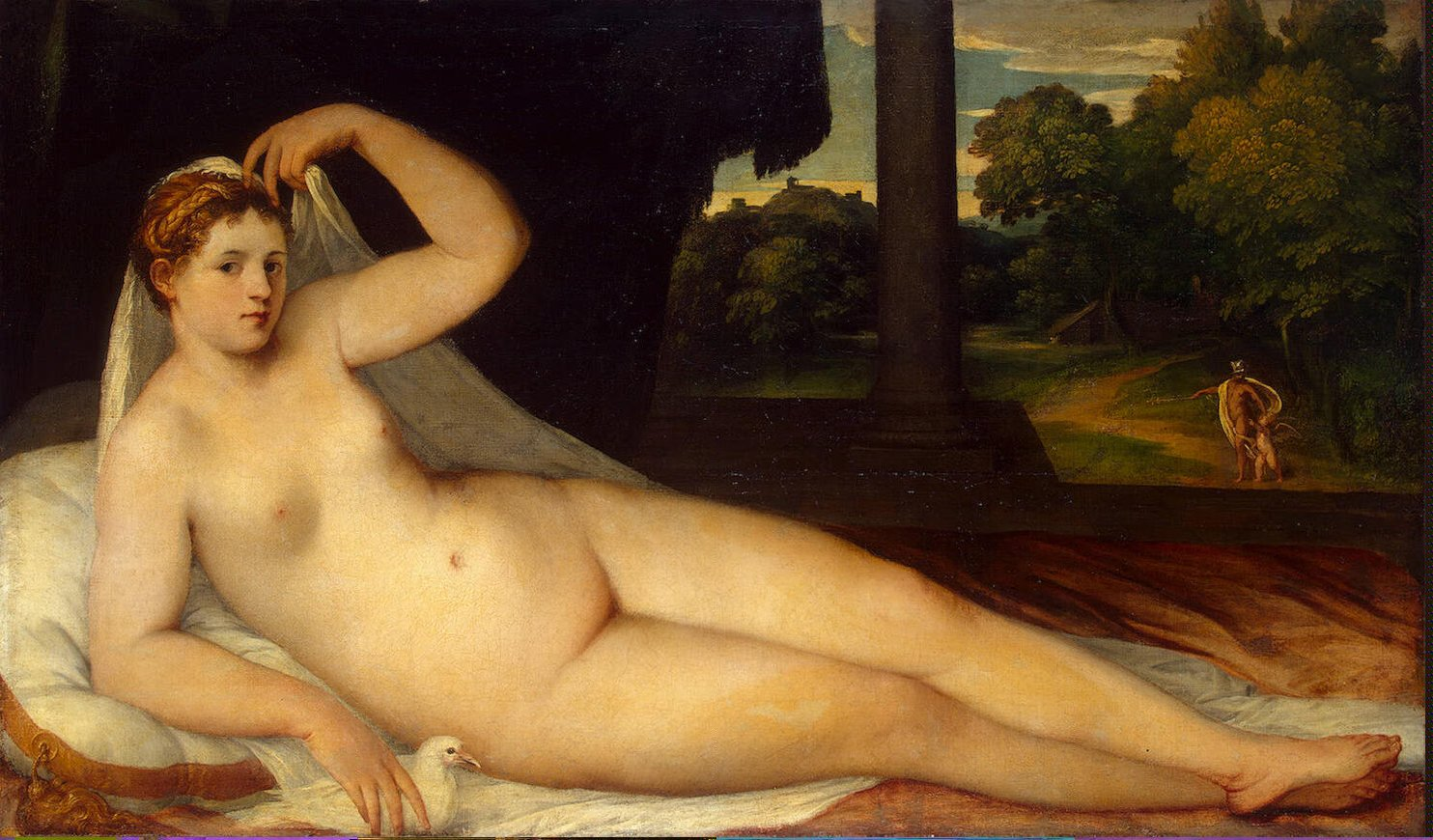
Venus
