= Venus and Cupid (Sustris) =

Painting by Lambert Sustris

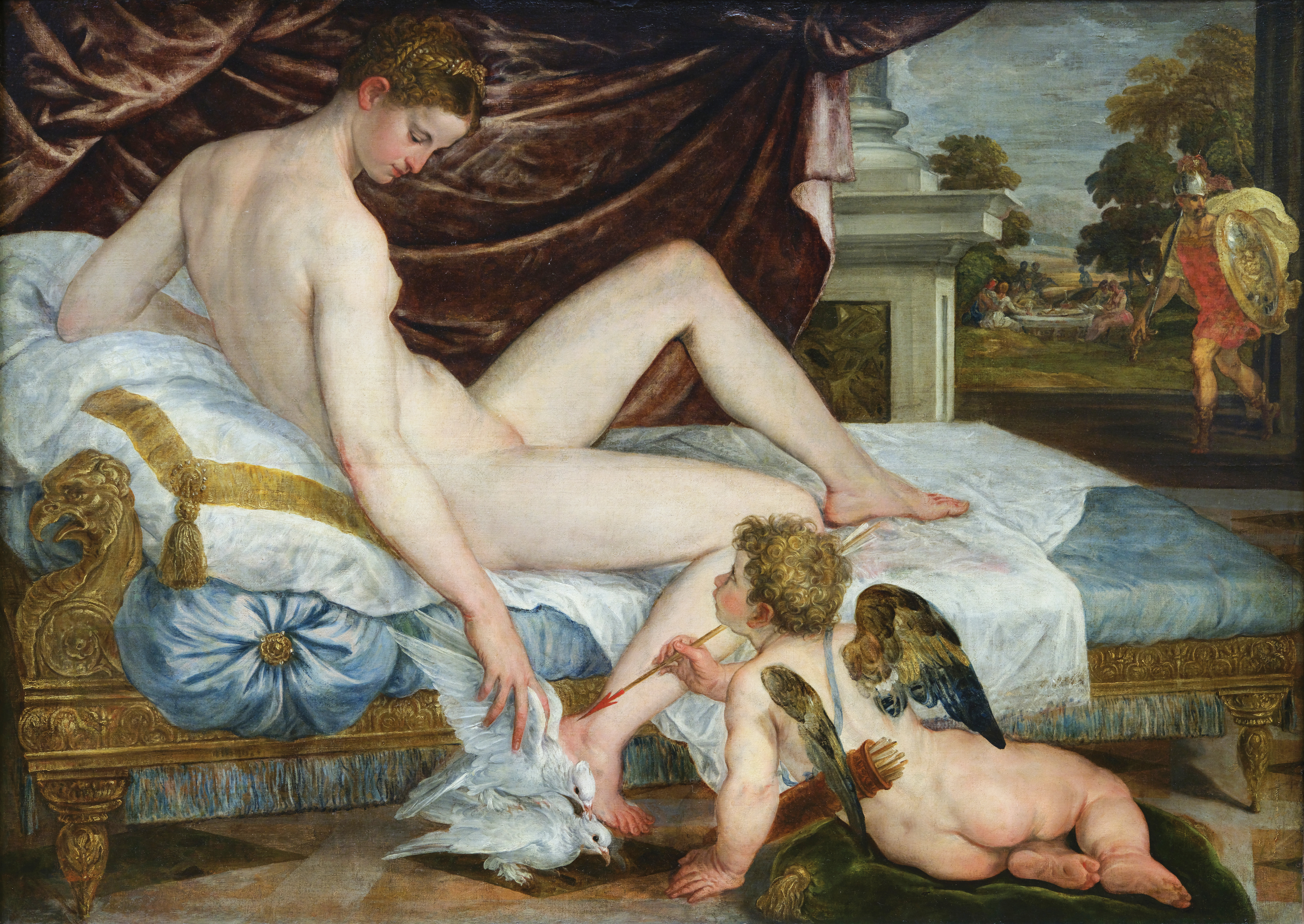
- Artist: Lambert Sustris
- Year: c. 1554
- Medium: oil on canvas
- Dimensions: 132 cm × 184 cm (52 in × 72 in)
- Location: Louvre Museum, Paris (France)
- Accession: INV 1978 and MR 1129
- Website: louvre.fr/...cl010061294

Venus and Cupid or Venus, Mars and Cupid is a c.1554 oil on canvas painting by Lambert Sustris, entering the French royal collection of Louis XIV in 1671 and now INV 1978 in the Louvre Museum, where it displayed in the Salle de la Joconde.

The artist was then a studio assistant to Titian and draws on his master's use of colour. Possibly commissioned by a member of the Fugger banking family in Augsburg (at least two of the five paintings by Sustris acquired by Louis are definitely known to have come from Augsburg).

Before Louis XIV, it was probably owned Everhard Jabach, who seems to have owned all the Sustris works later acquired by Louis and may have bought an auction lot of works by the artist at a sale of the Fuggers' goods in Augsburg in 1650. It was probably then bought from Jabach by superintendent Nicolas Fouquet, then sequestered from him under the guardianship of Charles Le Brun in 1662 and fully seized by the king nine years later.
