= A Young Woman Seated at the Virginals =

Painting by Johannes Vermeer

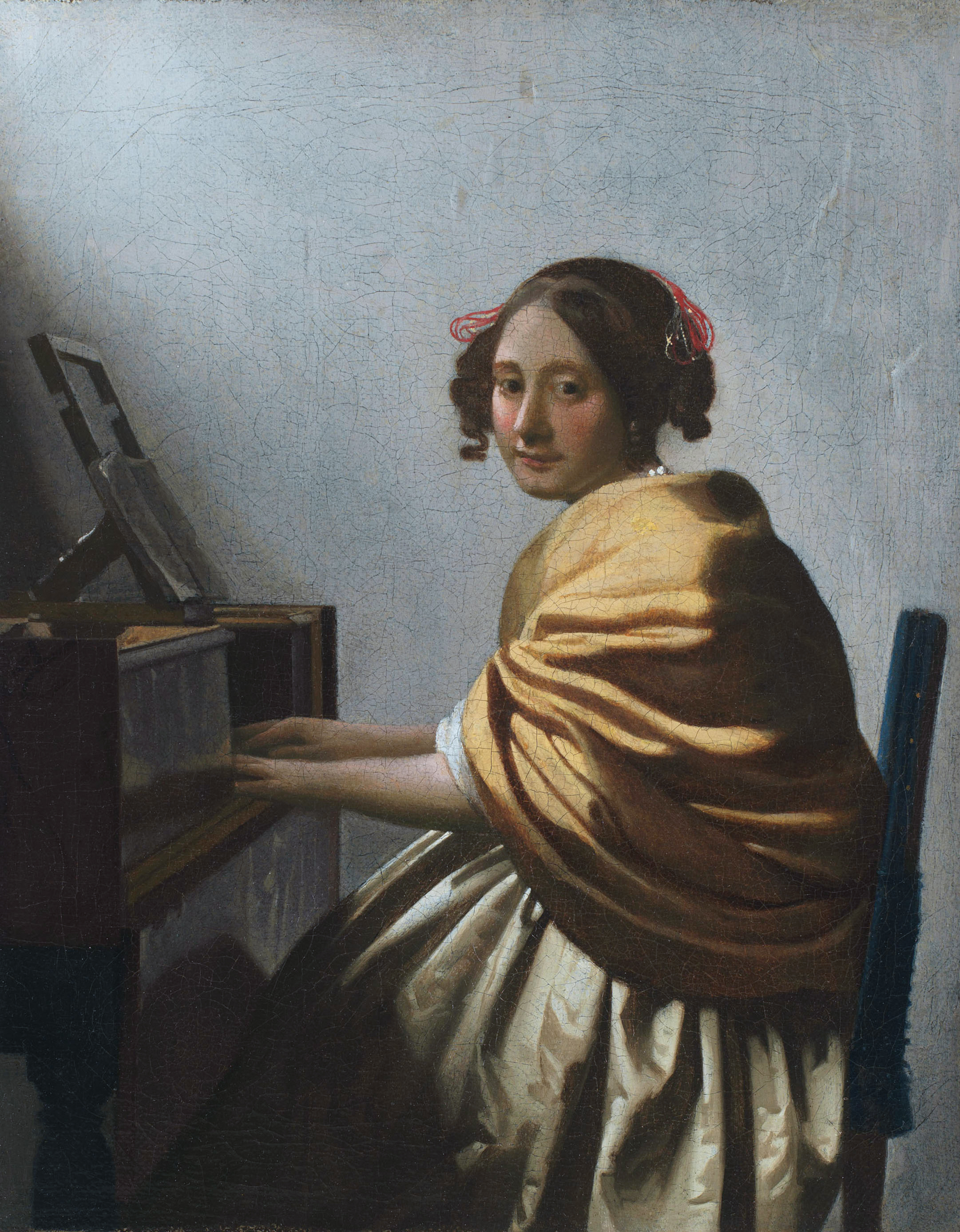
- Artist: Johannes Vermeer
- Year: c. 1670–1672
- Medium: Oil on canvas
- Dimensions: 25.1 cm × 20 cm (9.9 in × 7.9 in)
- Location: Leiden Collection; New York

A Young Woman Seated at the Virginals is a painting by Johannes Vermeer, though this was for a long time widely questioned. A series of technical examinations from 1993 onwards confirm the attribution. It is thought to date from c.1670 and is now in part of the Leiden Collection in New York. It should not be confused with Young Woman Seated at a Virginal in the National Gallery, London, also by Vermeer.

== Provenance and attribution ==
The painting's early provenance is unclear, though possibly it was owned in Vermeer's lifetime by Pieter van Ruijven and later inherited by Jacob Dissius. By 1904 it was one of two Vermeers owned by Alfred Beit, the other being Lady Writing a Letter with her Maid. It remained in the Beit family until sold to Baron Rolin in 1960. The painting was not widely known until described in the catalogue of the Beit collection published in 1904. In the first decades following 1904 it was widely accepted as a Vermeer. Then in the mid-twentieth century, as some "Vermeers" were discovered to be forgeries by Han van Meegeren and doubt was cast on others, it fell from favour.

In 1993 Baron Rolin asked Sotheby's to conduct research into the painting. A series of technical examinations followed, which have convinced most experts that it is a Vermeer. Rolin's heirs sold the painting through Sotheby's in 2004 to Steve Wynn for $30 million. It was later purchased for the Leiden Collection owned by Thomas Kaplan. It has appeared in several Vermeer exhibitions in recent years, in the United States, Britain, Japan, Italy, France, and the Netherlands.

== Description and evidence for attribution ==
The painting originally had the same dimensions as Vermeer's Lacemaker. Tentative evidence that the canvas was cut from the same bolt as the Lacemaker, which was gathered in the 1990s, was strengthened by a later, more sophisticated study. The ground appears identical to that used for the two Vermeers owned by London's National Gallery. X-ray examination has revealed evidence of a pin-hole at the vanishing point, as habitually used by Vermeer in conjunction with a thread to achieve correct perspective in his paintings. Pigments are used in the painting in a way typical of Vermeer, most notably the expensive ultramarine as a component in the background wall. The use of green earth in shadows is also distinctive. The use of lead-tin-yellow suggests that the painting cannot be a nineteenth- or twentieth-century fake or imitation. Examination of the cloak, often cited as the crudest part of the painting, shows that it was painted over another garment after some time had elapsed. Technical research completed in advance of the Rijksmuseum's Vermeer exhibition of 2023, however, determines that the yellow shawl was indeed painted by Vermeer.

The hairstyle can be dated to c.1670, and matches the hairstyle in the Lacemaker, which on other grounds is also often dated to the same period. It is not clear if the painting was completed before or after the similar but more ambitious Young Woman Seated at a Virginal in the National Gallery, London. The painting is unsigned.

== Criticism and interpretation ==
Walter Liedtke has described the painting as a "minor late work" by Vermeer. The colour scheme is typical of Vermeer's mature work. The "luminosity and finely modelled passages" of the young woman's skirt recall the Lady Standing at a Virginal and are often cited as the painting's best feature, contrasting with the less skillfully painted cloak. The blurring of objects in the foreground, the quality of the light and the attention paid to the texture of the wall are typical of Vermeer, while the handling of the pearls in the woman's hair recalls the threads spilling from the cushion in the Lacemaker.

== See also ==
- List of paintings by Johannes Vermeer
