= The Lace Maker =

Painting by Caspar Netscher

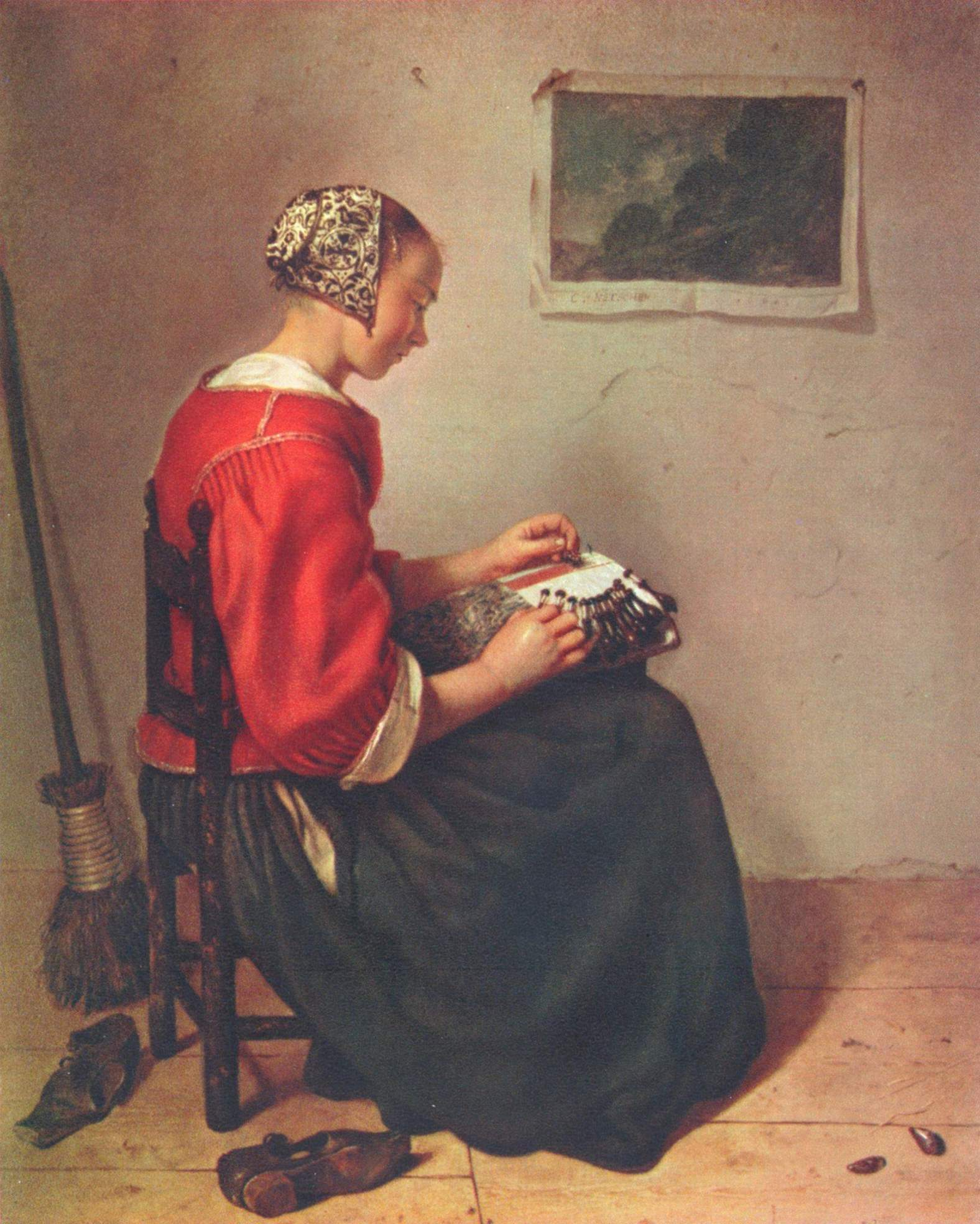
- Artist: Caspar Netscher
- Year: 1662
- Medium: oil paint, canvas
- Dimensions: 33 cm (13 in) × 27 cm (11 in)
- Location: Wallace Collection
- Owner: Julie Amelie Charlotte Castelnau, Francis Seymour-Conway, 3rd Marquess of Hertford, Johan Pompe van Meerdervoort
- Accession no.: P237
- Identifiers: RKDimages ID: 237494; Art UK artwork ID: the-lace-maker-209241

The Lace Maker (1662) is an oil on canvas painting by the Dutch painter Caspar Netscher. It is an example of a Dutch Golden Age painting and is part of the Wallace Collection.

The woman is sitting working over a lace pillow on bobbin lace.

This painting was documented by Hofstede de Groot in 1913, who wrote; "48. THE LACE MAKER. Sm. 21. Full length. A young girl, simply dressed, sits in profile to the right. She is working with both hands at a bobbin-lace cushion held on her lap. She wears a green skirt, a bright red bodice with the white under-garment showing at the neck and the elbows, and a light cap embroidered in black. Behind her on the floor in the left foreground lie her shoes; beyond them, in the corner, stands a broom. At the back is a sunlit wall, on which to the right an unframed landscape print is loosely pinned with two nails. Signed "C. Netscher," on the margin of the print, and dated 166- [1662, according to the Pompe sale-catalog] [but 1664, according to Sir Claude Phillips and Mr. D. S. MacColl Translator]; panel [canvas, according to Mr. MacColl], 13 inches by 10 1/2 inches. Exhibited at the British Institution, London, 1818. Sales. J. Pompe van Meerdervoort, Soeterwoude, May 19, 1780, No. 5 (700 florins, Delfos). M. van Leyden, Paris, September 10, 1804 (7000 francs, Paillet) see Ch. Blanc, ii. 221. London, 1807 (£199: 10s.). In the collection of the Marquess of Hertford, London, 1833 (Sm.). In the Wallace Collection, London, 1910 catalog, No. 237."
