= Woman with a Parrot at a Window =

Painting by Caspar Netscher

'Woman with a Parrot at a Window (1666) by Caspar Netscher

Woman with a Parrot at a Window, Woman at a Window or Woman with a Parrot is a 1666 oil-on-canvas painting by Caspar Netscher (1639–1684), which has been in the National Gallery of Art, in Washington, D.C., since 2016.

== Provenance ==
=== 1930–1950 ===
Originally in the Alte Pinakothek in Munich, it was probably confiscated by the Nazi regime in the late 1930s to sell for foreign currency. It was handed to the Kunsthandlung Julius Böhler auction house which in 1938 sold it to a Dutch art dealer. It was bought by the Jewish couple Hugo and Elisabeth Jacoba Andriesse in Belgium.

It and the rest of the Andriesses' collection were placed in the Royal Museums of Fine Arts of Belgium's store in 1939 for safe keeping and they fled to the United States via Portugal on the German invasion of Belgium the following year. Hugo died in 1942 in the USA, leaving his wife as his sole heir – she died in 1963. The whole of the Andriesses' collection was confiscated by the Reichsleiter Rosenberg Taskforce. The "list of art objects handed over to Reichsmarschall Herman Göring's collection" for 1942 shows Woman was received on 14 March that year by the Paris working group.

After World War Two the work passed to the art dealer Änne Abels in Cologne, who in 1950 sold it to Rudolf Ziersch (1867–1962), an entrepreneur and art collector from Barmen who had previously been president of the Bergischen Industrie- und Handelskammer Wuppertal-Remscheid and chairman of the Kunst- nd Museumsverein Wuppertal Later in 1950 Ziersch donated the work to the Städtische Museum Wuppertal (now known as the Von der Heydt-Museum) to mark its fiftieth anniversary.

=== Restitution and acquisition ===
Elisabeth Andriesse's heirs (a charitable institution in the USA) applied for the work's restitution in 2013. The City Council of Wuppertal formally voted on the resolution on 24 February 2014. At the end of January 2014, the compensation office had still not responded as to whether compensation payments had already been paid; the basic release was subject to this response. Further details of the restitution were then clarified at the administrative level. According to its director Gerhard Finckh, the Von der Heydt Museum had no objection to the work's return to Andriesse's heirs but realised that the work in effect "actually belongs to the Alte Pinakothek". Netscher painted seven versions of the picture, which complicated the issue, though a number on the back of the work under discussion referred to the Alte Pinakothek.

The City Council of Wuppertal formally voted on the resolution on February 24, 2014. At the end of January 2014, the compensation office had still not responded as to whether compensation payments had already been made; the basic release was subject to this response.[4] Further details of the restitution were clarified at the administrative level. In May 2014 Andriesse's heirs announced they would like to auction the work for charity at Christie's in New York, giving the proceedings to a cancer centre. Christie's hoped the work would sell for 3 million US dollars (around 2.2 million Euros). It was in the end bought for 5 million US dollars to its present owner in October 2016.
