= Caspar Netscher =

Dutch painter (1639–1684)

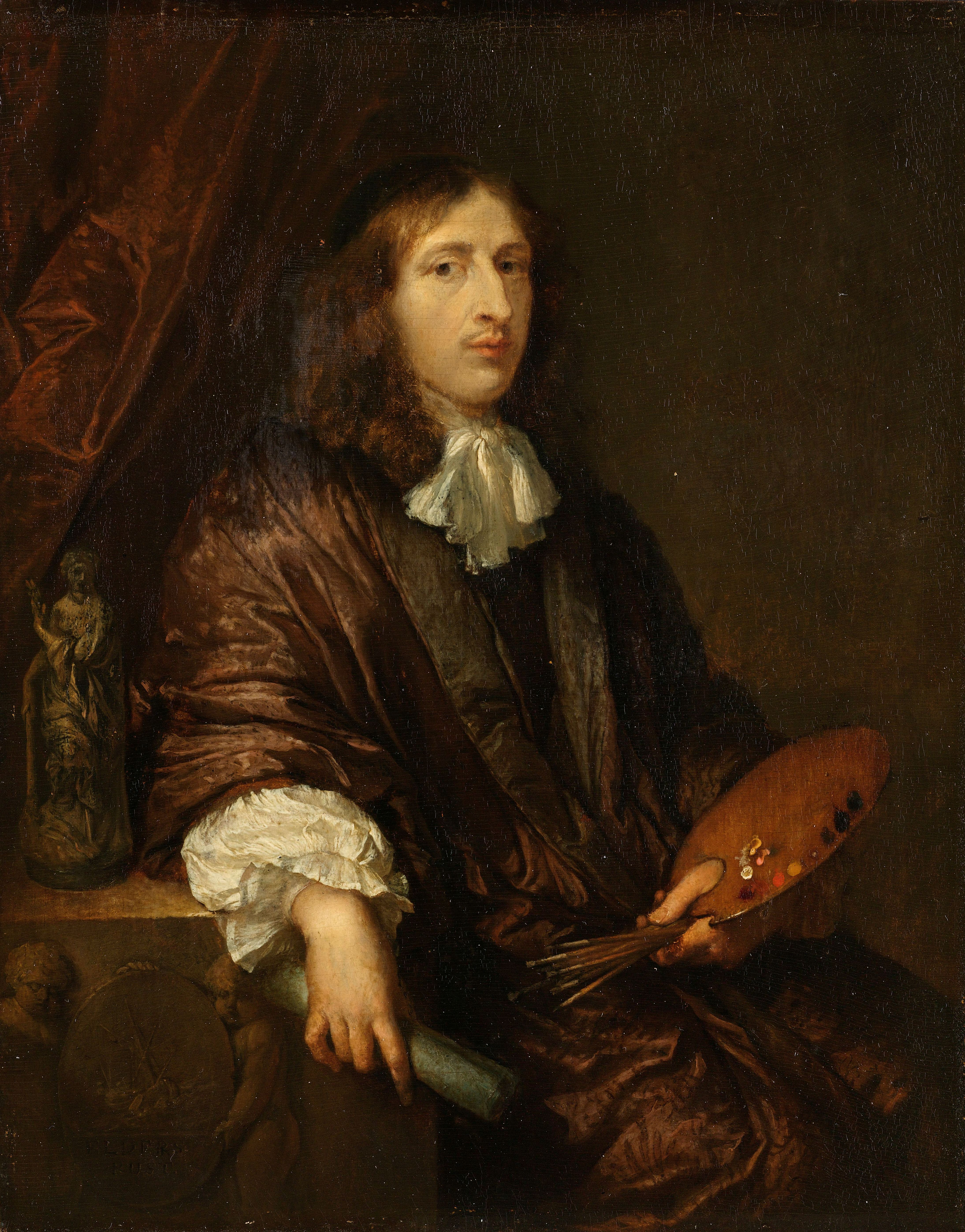
- Self-portrait, 1660–1684
- Born: 1639; Heidelberg or Prague
- Died: January 15, 1684 (Age 45); The Hague, Netherlands
- Style: Genre work

Caspar (or Gaspar) Netscher (1639 – January 15, 1684) was a Dutch painter. He was a master in depicting oriental rugs, silk and brocade and introduced an international style to the Northern Netherlands.

== Life ==
According to Arnold Houbraken's 17th-century biographical study of Dutch painters he was born in Heidelberg or Prague. His father Johann Netscher was a sculptor from Stuttgart. The elder Netscher married Elizabet Vetter, the daughter of a mayor in Heidelberg, against her father's wishes. He died in Poland when Caspar was two years of age. It has been suggested that Caspar may have been the son of a Rotterdam painter. When Heidelberg was attacked during the civil war, Caspar's mother fled with four children to an estate outside the city. When the castle was laid under siege, the people there suffered from hunger and Caspar's two older brothers died. Caspar's mother fled in the night, carrying the young Caspar in her arms and with her young daughter on foot, staying at almshouses for widows and orphans. They travelled in this way to Arnhem, where they finally found safe quarter. In Arnhem Caspar was adopted by a rich physician named A. Tullekens. At first he was destined for the profession of his patron, but owing to his great aptitude for painting he was placed under a local artist named Hendrick Coster, and through the acquaintance of Wynant Everwyn in 1654, who had family connections to Tullekens, he became a student of Ter Borch in Deventer. He was Ter Borch's most gifted pupil, probably worked as an assistant as well and he appears several times as a model on Ter Borch's paintings.

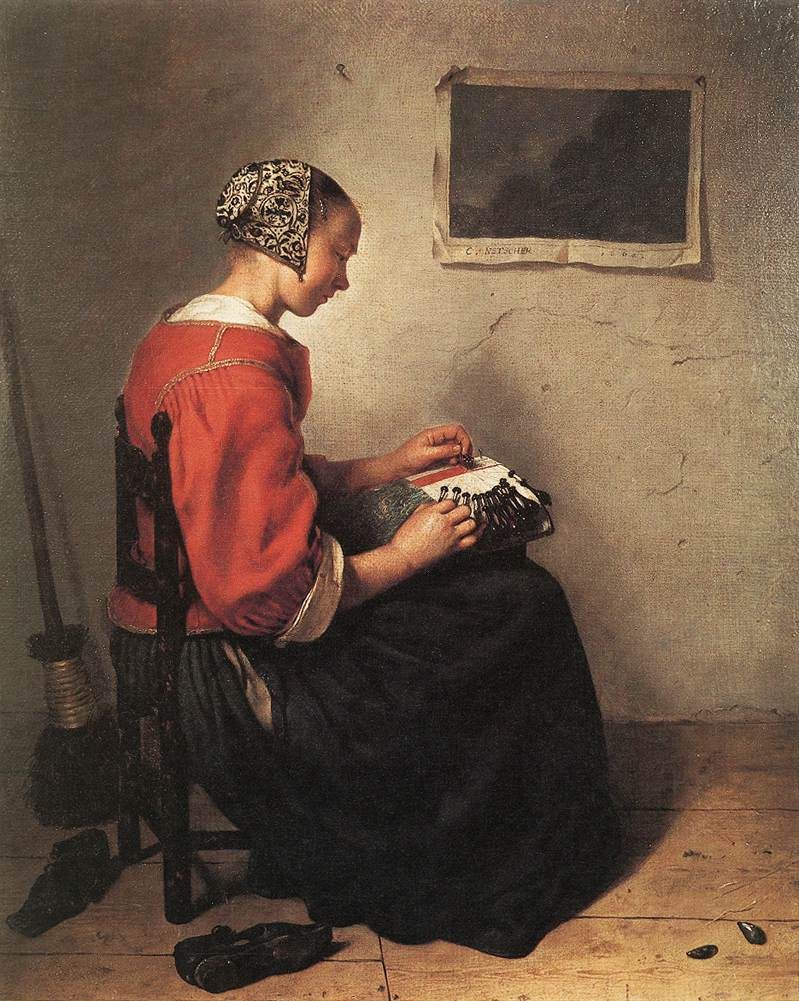
The Lace Maker by Caspar Netscher (1662), oil on canvas, 33 x 27 cm. Wallace Collection, London

When he came of age, he first worked for the Dutch "keelbeulen" (Houbraken called art dealers "cutthroats") until he had enough money to make a grand tour. In 1658 he set out for Italy to complete his education, booking passage on a ship to Bordeaux with letters of introduction from Tullekens for his cousin Neny there. From Bordeaux he planned to proceed overland to Italy. However, while in Bordeaux he met the mathematician and fountain designer Godijn, and married his daughter Margaretha Godijn on 25 November 1659, which halted his progress to Rome. In Bordeaux he toiled hard to earn a livelihood by painting small cabinet pictures which are now highly valued on account of their exquisite finish. Fearing the persecutions of Protestants, after his son was born he moved back North to The Hague in 1662, and turned his attention to portrait-painting. In this branch of his art, he was more successful. In 1668 he joined the Schutterij and Cosimo III de' Medici, traveling through the Netherlands bought four paintings.

It is likely that Netscher knew the painters Frans van Mieris, Sr. (1635?–1681) and Gerard Dou, but it is certain that he knew the painter Gerrit de Hooch from The Hague as his wife gave her name to Gerrit's new born daughter Margarita in 1676, the event being witnessed by Caspar as well as his wife. He was patronized by William III, and his earnings soon enabled him to gratify his own taste by depicting musical and conversational pieces.

It was in these that Netscher's genius was fully displayed. The choice of these subjects, and the habit of introducing female figures, dressed in glossy satins, were imitated from Ter Borch; they possess easy yet delicate pencilling, brilliant and correct colouring, and pleasing light and shade; but frequently their refinement passes into weakness. The painter was gaining both fame and wealth when he began to suffer from gout and took to his bed, where he continued to paint lying down and died prematurely in 1684, in The Hague. His sons Constantyn (1668–1722), and Theodorus (1661–1732), were also painters after their father's style, who Houbraken meant to include in his 4th volume of painters. He was also the father of Anthonie Netscher who emigrated to Batavia. According to the RKD, his registered pupils in the Confrerie Pictura besides his three sons were Johannes van den Brande, Otto Brandt, Olivier van Deuren, Jacob van der Does the younger, Van Hardenbroeck, Daniël Haringh, Mouritz van der Linden, J. Spick, Jan Tilius and Aleida Wolfsen.

== Gallery ==
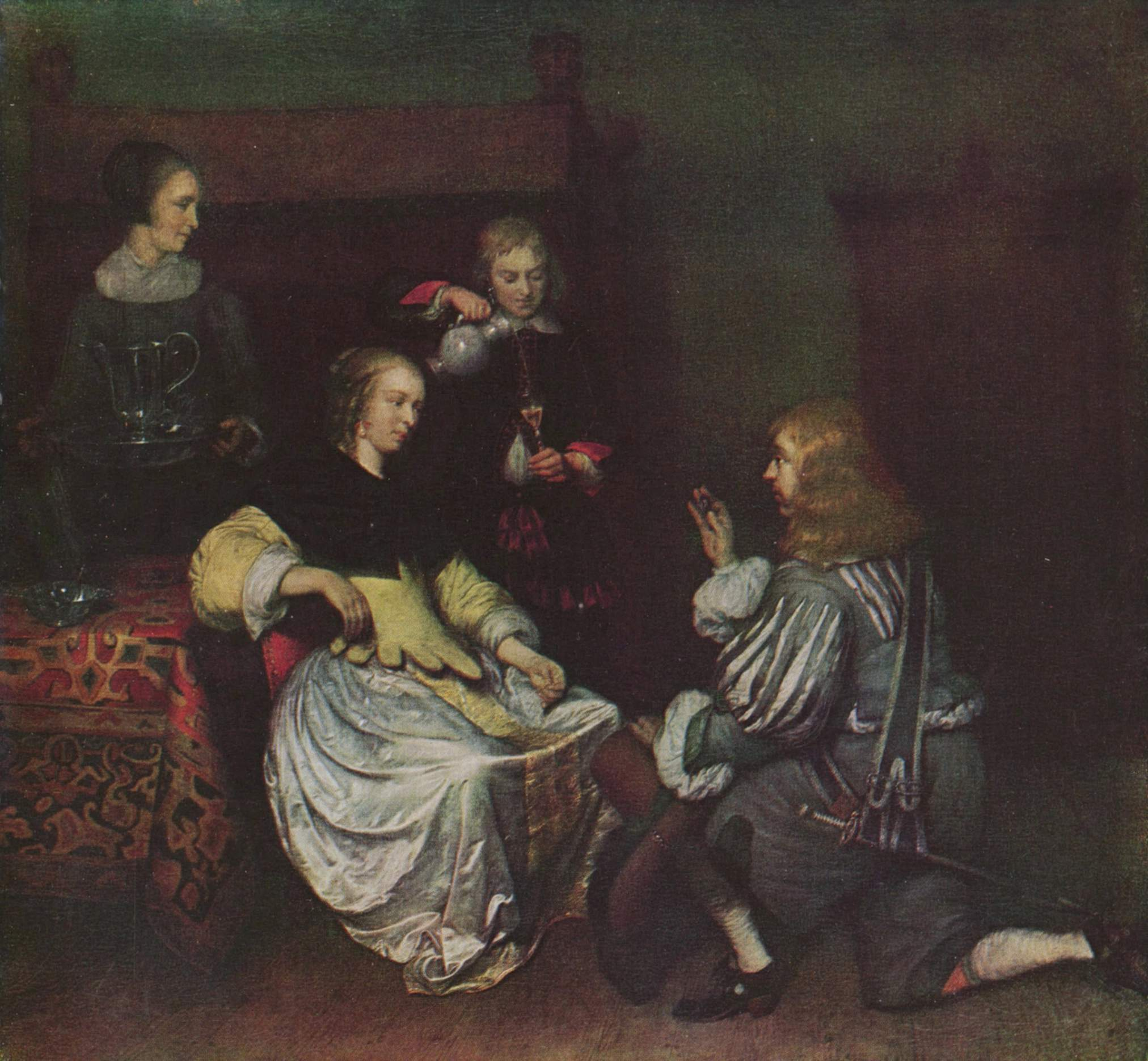
Presentation of The Medallion

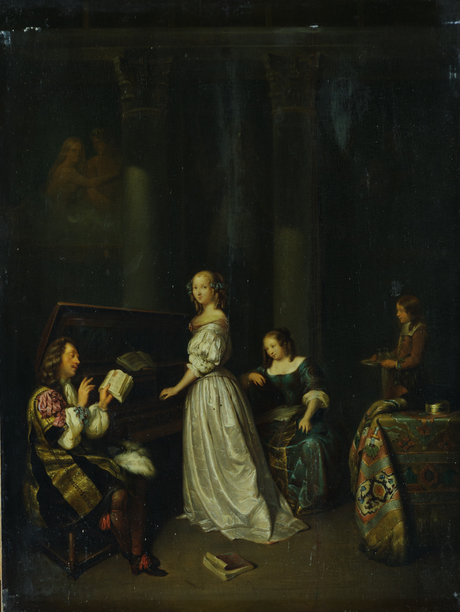
Singing lesson

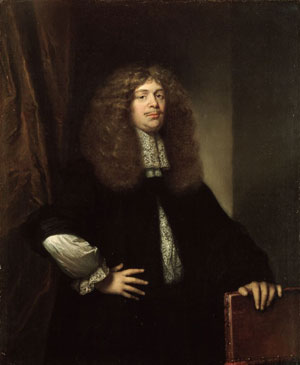
Coenraad van Beuningen

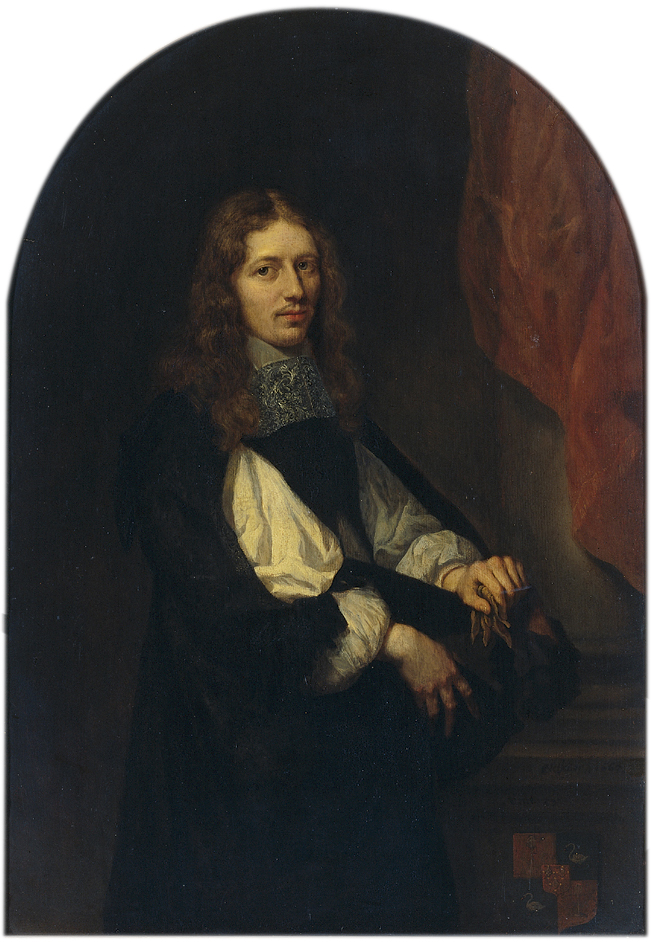
Pieter de Graeff

Christiaan Huygens

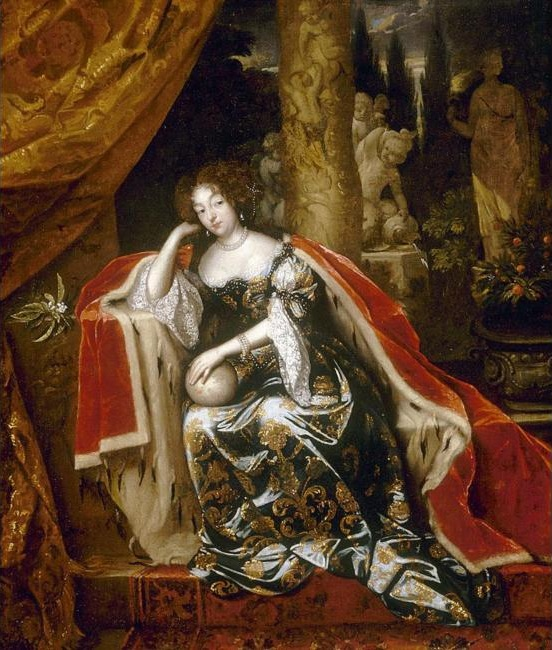
Mary II of England

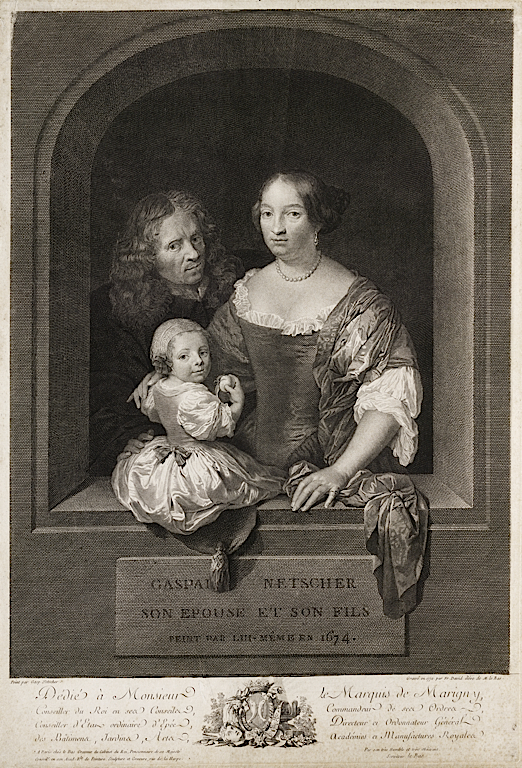
François-Anne David after Caspar Netscher, Caspar Netscher with His Family, 1772, engraving

Woman with a Parrot at a Window
