= Woman Reading a Letter =

Woman Reading a Letter may refer to:

- Woman Reading a Letter (Metsu), a mid-1660s painting by Gabriël Metsu
- Woman Reading a Letter (Vermeer), a painting from around 1663 by Johannes Vermeer
