= Hendrick Sorgh =

Dutch art collector (1666–1720)

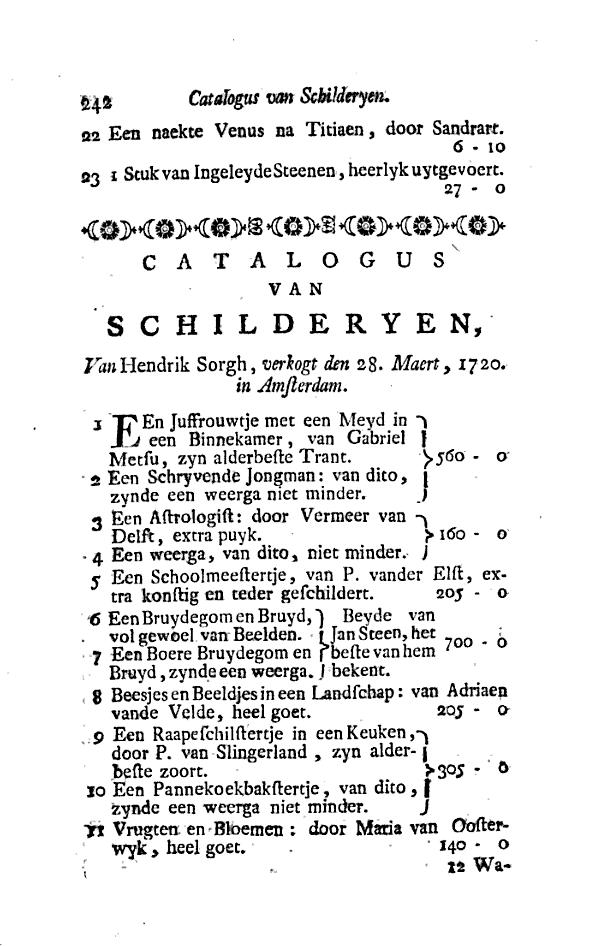
1720 Catalog by Gerard Hoet listing ten works.

Hendrick Sorgh (baptized 6 November 1666 - buried 23 January 1720) was a broker and art collector in Amsterdam.

== Ancestry ==
His father Marten Sorgh (ca 1641-1702) was registered as a silk trader when he became an Amsterdam citizen in 1665. Sorgh, who came from Rotterdam, probably was the son of the painter Hendrick Martensz Sorgh and Adriaantje Hollaer, but being from a Remonstrant family not always a birth certificate did survive.

His mother Elisabeth Rombouts was the daughter of Jacob Romboutsz, an Amsterdam silk trader. In the summer of 1675, Vermeer borrowed 1,000 guilders in Amsterdam from Jacob Romboutsz, using Maria Thins, his mother-in-law's property as a surety. Her grandfather was Arminius, a Remonstrant theologian.

His parents married in May 1665. Their first child Hendrick was baptized at home, like all of his brothers and sisters.

== Collection ==
In 1693 Hendrick became a poorter of Amsterdam. He lived on Keizersgracht. Sorgh had an impressive art collection of 67 paintings, which was sold on 28 March 1720 two months after his death.

- Woman Reading a Letter by Gabriel Metsu with its pendant.
- Man Writing a Letter.
- The Astronomer and
- The Geographer by Johannes Vermeer, supposedly through a sale after the dead of Adriaen Paets.
- Adriaen van de Velde
- Pieter Hermansz Verelst
- Pieter Cornelisz van Slingelandt
- Maria van Oosterwijck

== Gallery ==
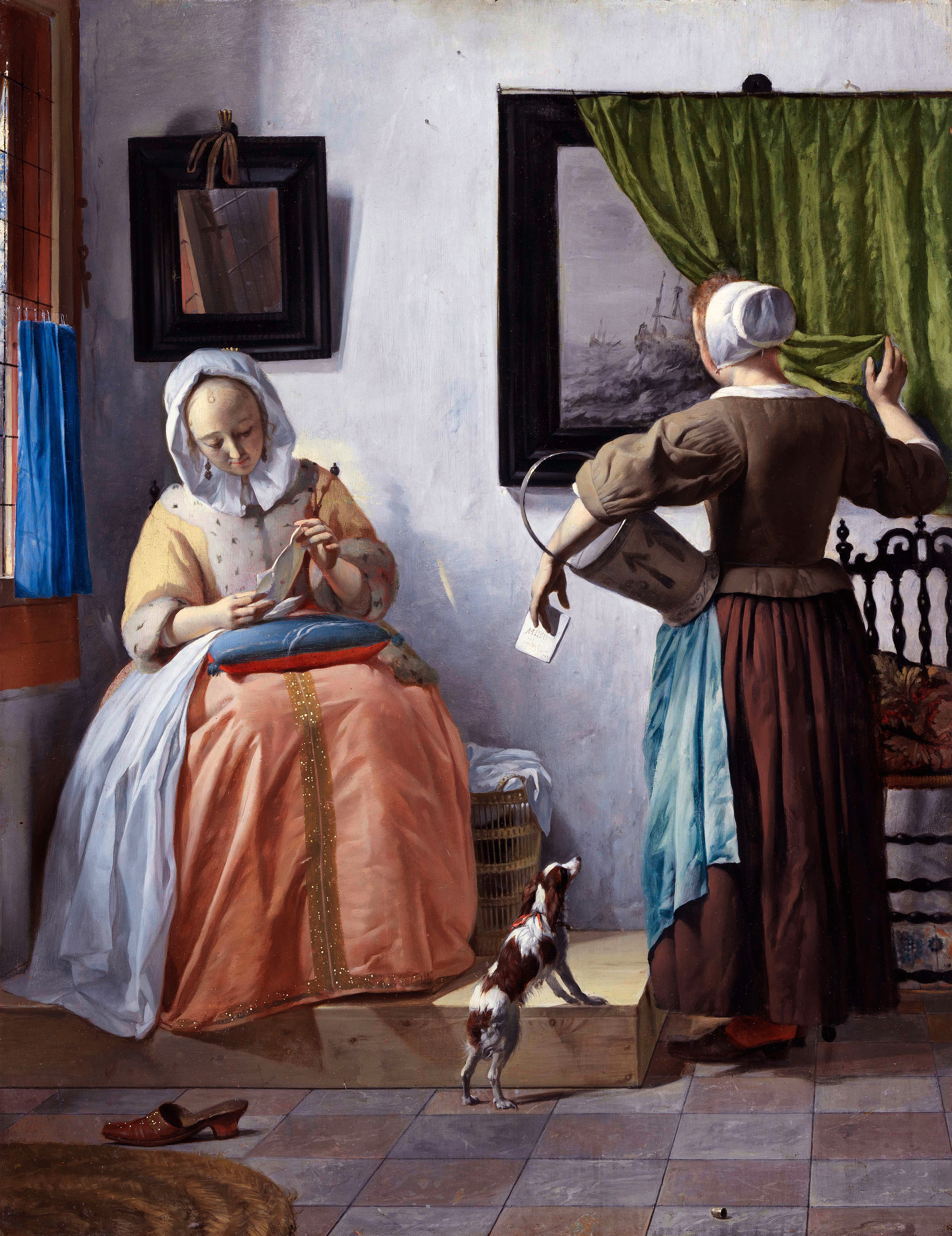

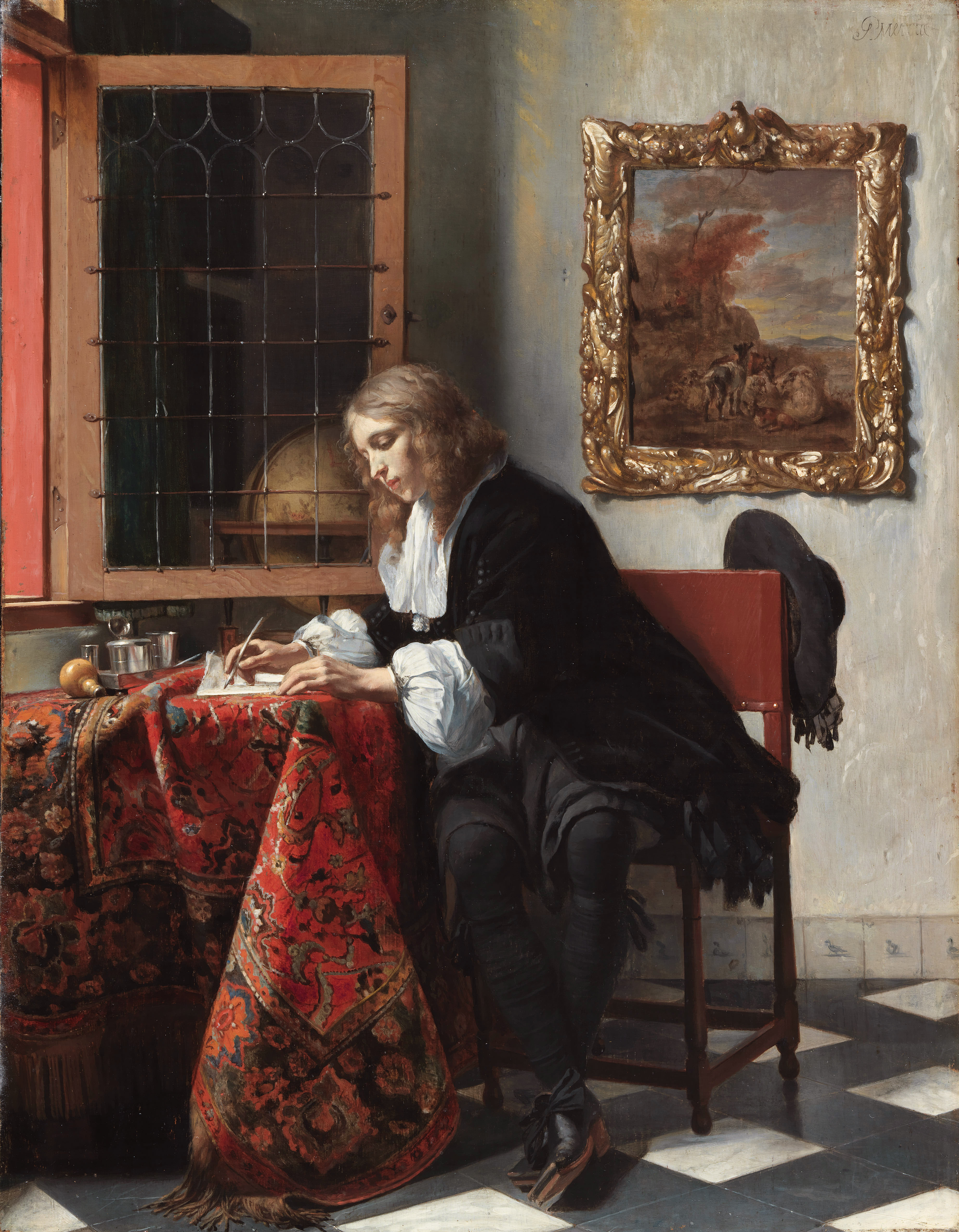

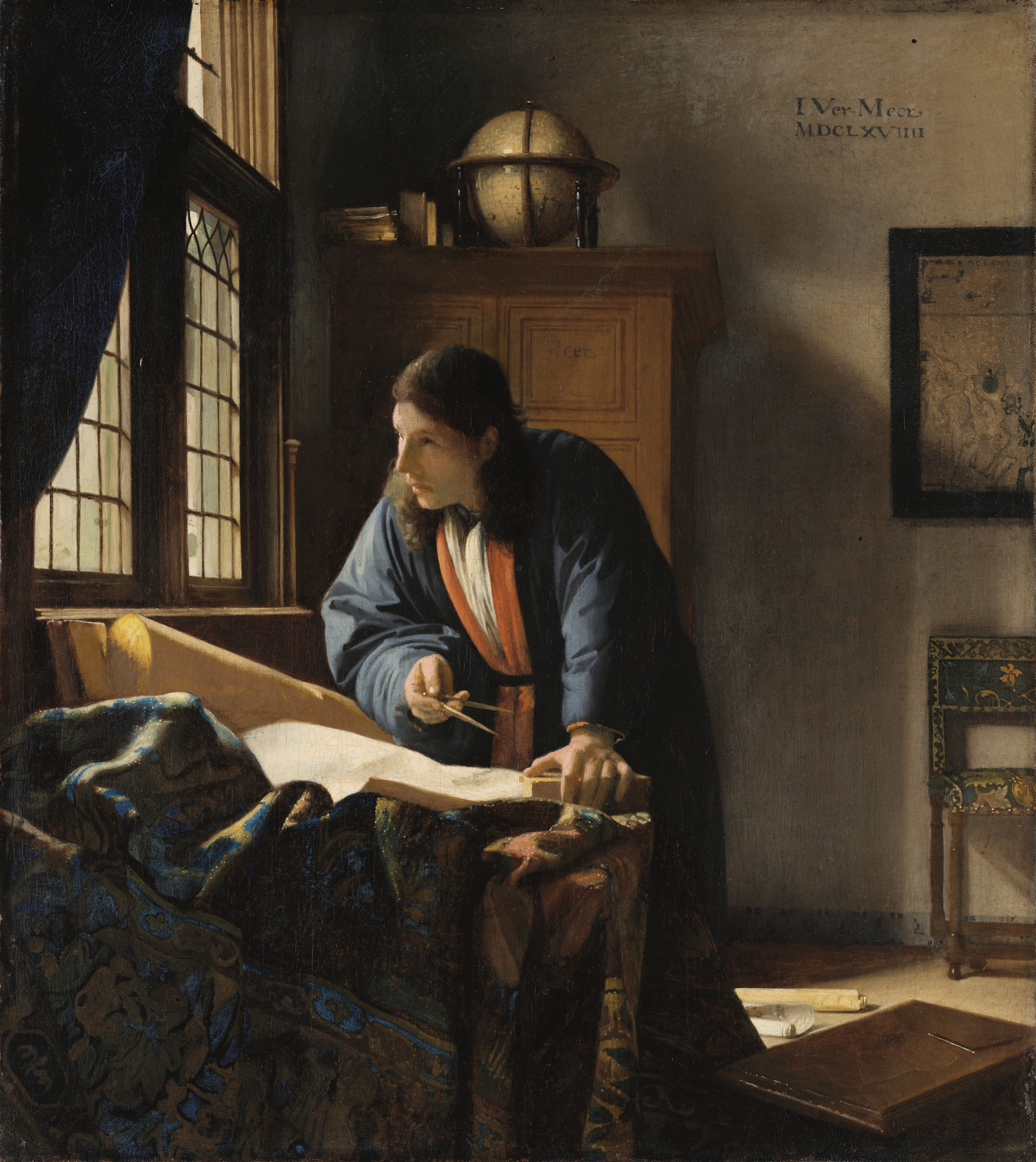

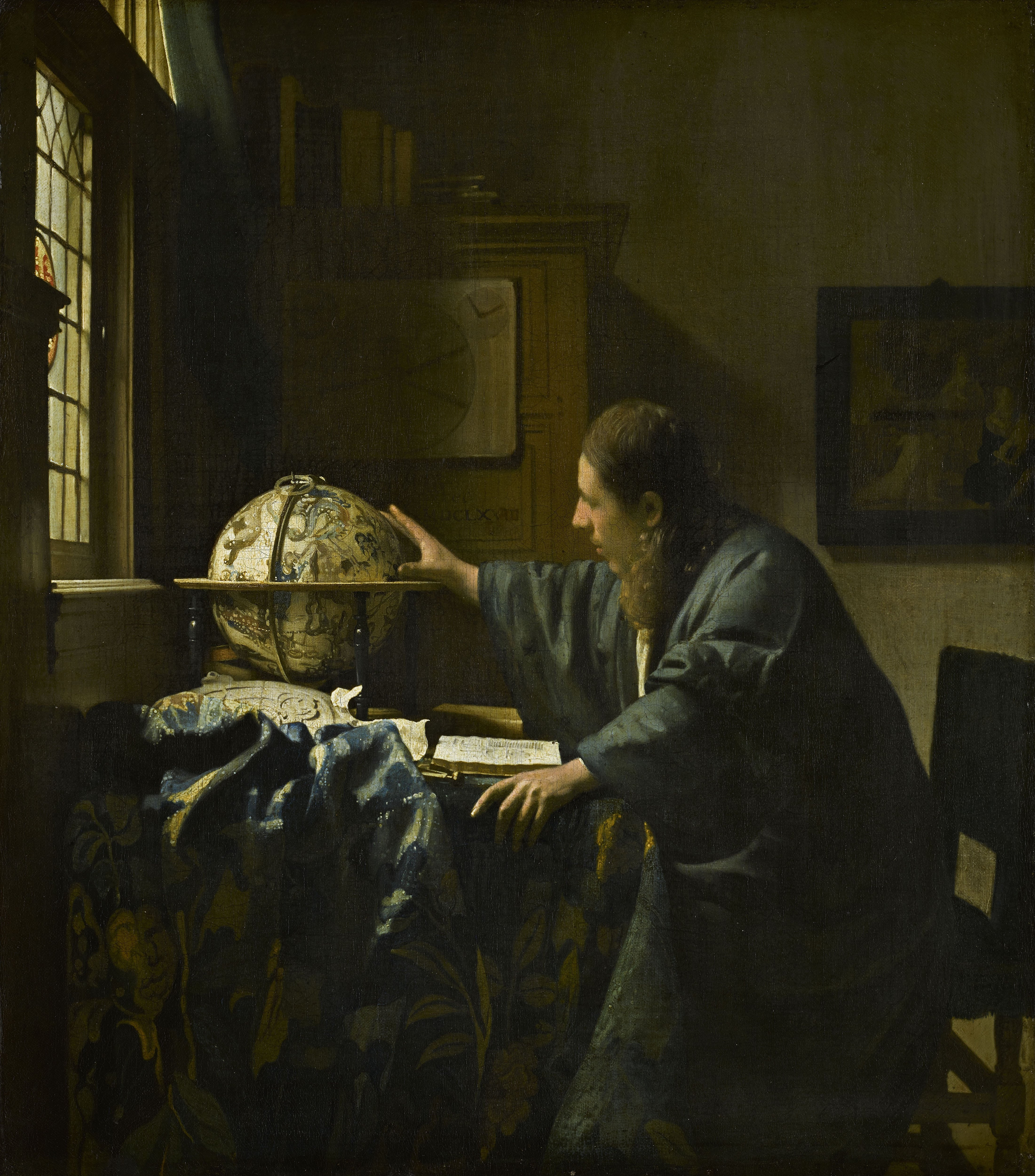

=== It further contained ===
Dido and Aeneas by Nicolaas Verkolje or Gerard de Lairesse? Hendrick Martensz Sorgh , Jan Steen , Jan Lievens , Huchtenburg , Jan van der Heyden , Paul Bril , Cornelis Pietersz Bega , Cornelis Dusart , Johannes Lingelbach , Nicolaes van Berchem , Adriaen van Ostade , Frederik de Moucheron , Jan Brueghel the Elder , Frans van Mieris , Abraham Willaerts , Barent Graat , Jacob Ruysdael , Jan Griffier

- Simon Vouet, the only French painter in his collection.
