= Astronomer (disambiguation) =

An astronomer is a scientist in the field of astronomy. "Astronomer" or "The Astronomer" may also refer to:

- Vita Hludovici or the "Limousin Astronomer", the anonymous author of the Vita Hludovici, a biography of Holy Roman Emperor Louis the Pious
- The Astronomer (Vermeer), a 1668 oil painting by the 17th century Dutch painter Johannes Vermeer
- Astronomer (comics), a Marvel Comics character
