= Hope Collection =

Hope Collection may refer to:

- The Hope Entomological Collections of Frederick William Hope at the Oxford University Museum of Natural History
- The Hope Collection of Pictures
- The Hope Collection formerly at Deepdene House and Gardens
