= Woman sealing a letter =

1659 painting by Gerard ter Borch

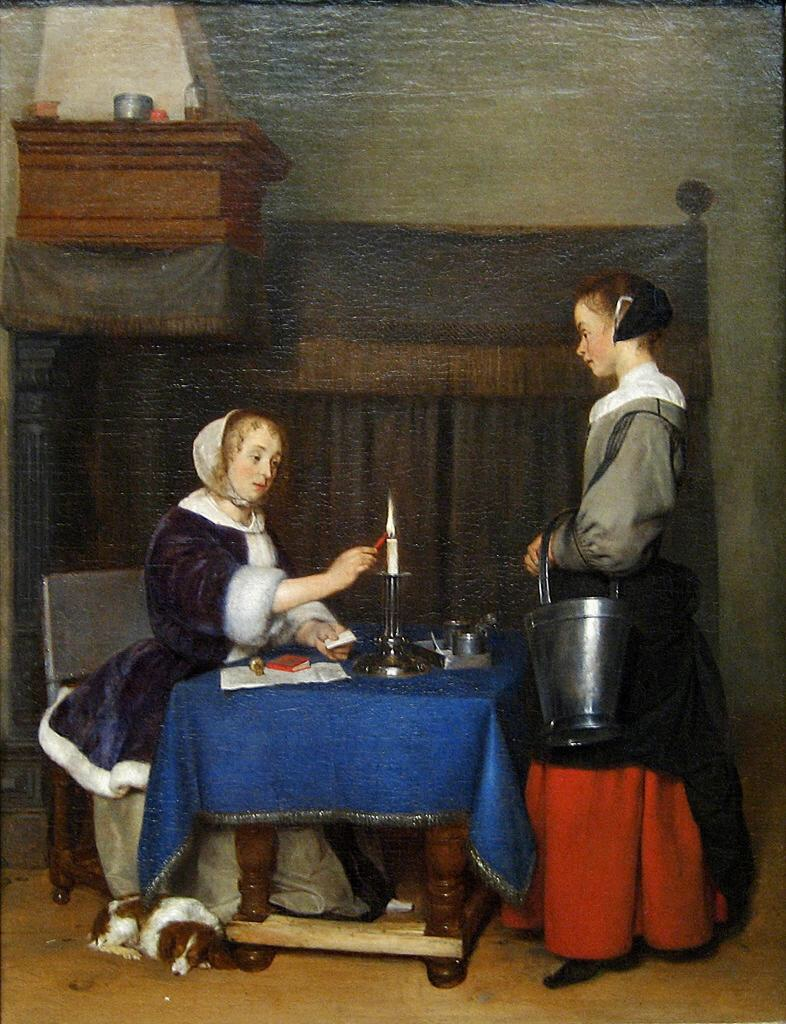
- Artist: Gerard ter Borch
- Year: 1659
- Medium: Oil on canvas
- Dimensions: 56.5 cm × 48.3 cm (22.2 in × 19.0 in)

Woman sealing a letter is an oil on canvas painting by the Dutch artist Gerard ter Borch, created in 1659. In 2004, the art critic Benjamin Genocchio wrote in teh New York Times that "The artist who did most to popularize the genre of letter painting was ter Borch", with Woman sealing a letter as one of the most notable of his works in the genre.

== Description ==
The painting depicts a Dutch interior scene. A woman sits at a table covered with a blue tablecloth with embroidered edges. She is melting wax with a candle to seal a letter. Writing utensils are visible on the table. Her clothing is that of a well-to-do woman; she wears a dark purple coat trimmed with white fur. A young maid stands nearby, holding a bucket. A spaniel lies on the floor near the table. The background shows a fireplace and a dark wall. The overall mood is calm and intimate.

This painting is supposed to be a pair with Officer Writing a Letter, with a Trumpeter and a Dog, and gave the idea of a pair to Gabriel Metsu who painted Woman Reading a Letter and Man Writing a Letter.

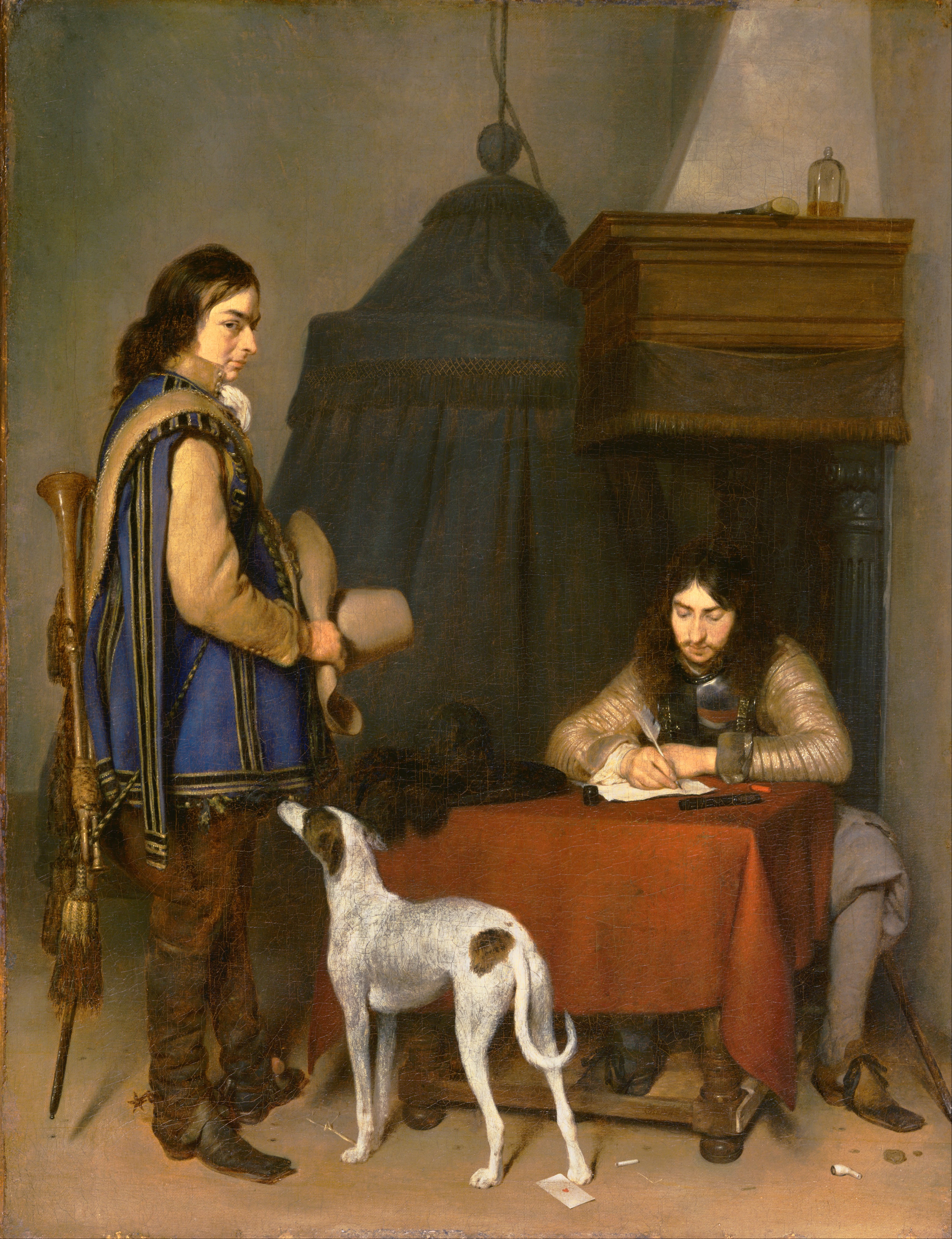
Officer Writing a Letter
