= Man Writing a Letter =

1660s painting by Gabriël Metsu

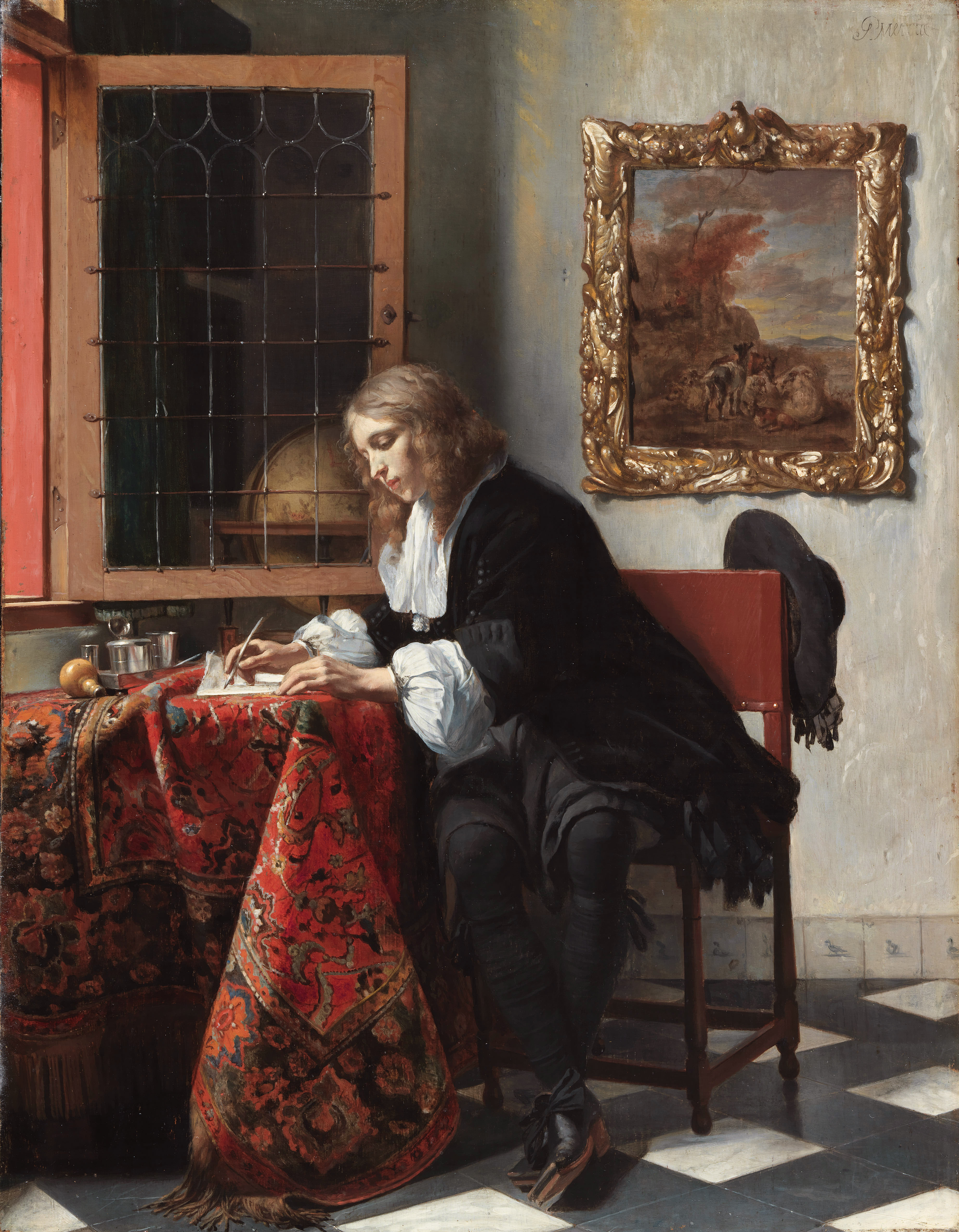
- Artist: Gabriël Metsu
- Year: c. 1664-1666
- Catalogue: NGI.4536
- Type: Oil on wood panel
- Dimensions: 52.5 cm × 40.2 cm (20.7 in × 15.8 in)
- Location: National Gallery of Ireland, Dublin

Man Writing a Letter is an oil painting on a wood panel Dutch painter Gabriël Metsu made at the height of his career. It is assumed to be a pair with Woman Reading a Letter. The two genre paintings (together with The Sick Child) are regarded as Metsu's artistic climax. Since 1987 they can be seen in the collection of the National Gallery of Ireland in Dublin.

== Description ==
The painting shows a young man sitting in front of an open window, writing a letter with a quill pen. He is dressed in a black silk suit with a white linen shirt underneath. The Persian rug and silver writing set on the table also show his wealth. The globe in the corner indicates his interest, as if he is a merchant or scientist. A pastoral landscape by Jacob van der Does the Elder is hanging on the wall; on top of the gilded frame, a dove is carved. The Delftware tiles on the baseboard show birds.

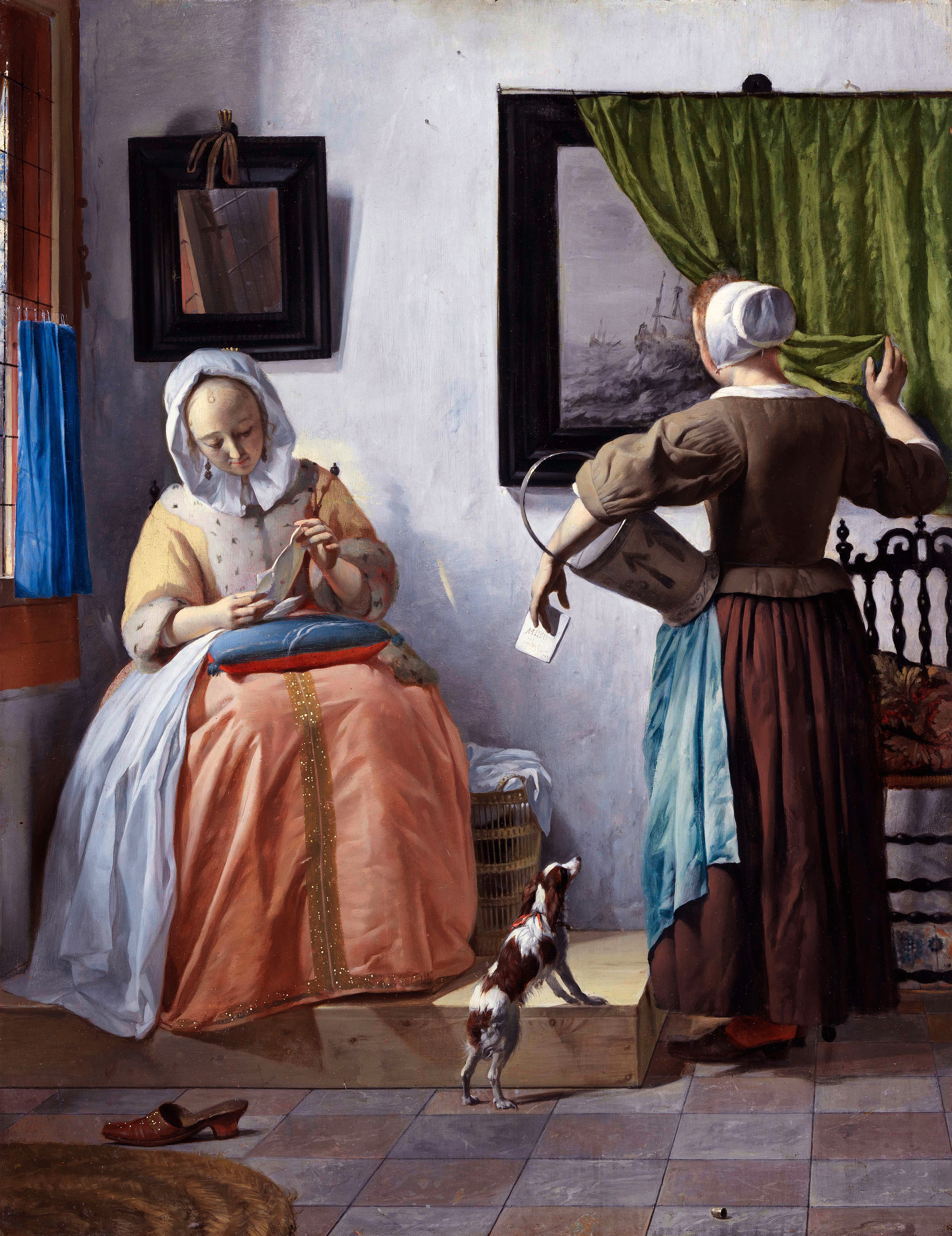
Woman Reading a Letter

Man Writing a Letter is a companion piece to Woman Reading a Letter, in which the woman has received the young man's letter and is reading it intently. Metsu likely got the idea for a pair of themed paintings from Gerard ter Borch, who had painted a similar pair: An Officer Writing a Letter and Woman Sealing a Letter with a Maidservant. Johannes Vermeer's influence is also reflected in the painting, such as the light from the left and the marble floor.

== History ==
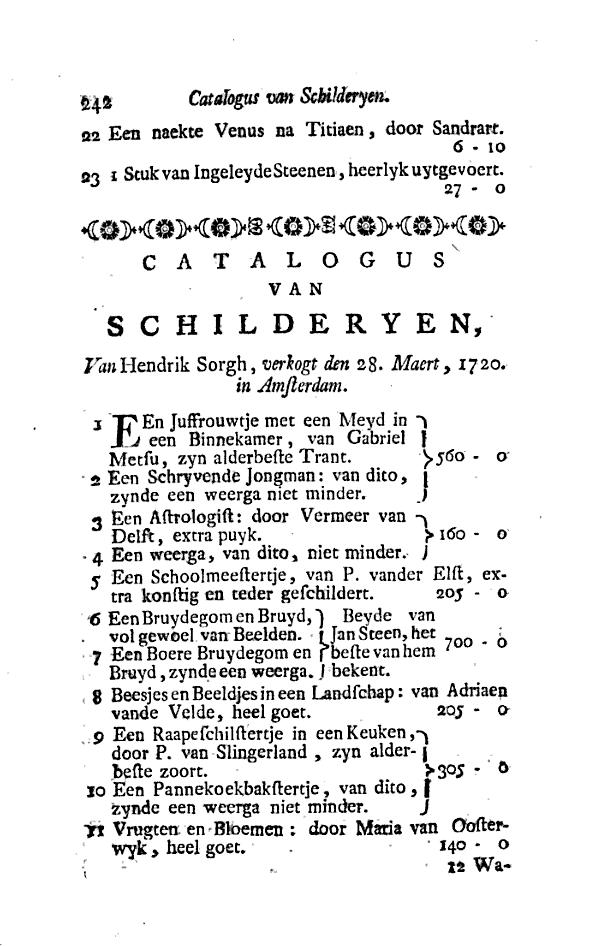
Catalog by Gerard Hoet listing the pair as 1 and 2

Records indicate the paintings have always been owned as a pair. The paintings were owned by Hendrick Sorgh, an art collector in Amsterdam. After his death they were sold for 560 guilders on 28 March 1720 to George Bruyn. When this underwriter died they were sold on 16 March 1724 for 785 guilders to Johannes Coop, a wealthy cotton printer and dyer. Circa 1744, and for 500 guilders, they came into the possession of Gerrit Braamcamp, a collector who owned no fewer than ten works by Metsu. His heirs benefited from the artist's popularity; on 31 July 1771 the two paintings were bought for 5,205 guilders by Jan Hope. They would descend to Lord Francis Pelham Clinton Hope, who sold them in 1898 as part of a collection of Dutch and Flemish paintings that was purchased by the art dealers A. Wertheimer and P. & D. Colnaghi. In 1900 the pair of paintings were bought by Alfred Beit, inherited by his brother Otto Beit (1906) and his son Sir Alfred Beit (1930). Both were among artworks stolen from Russborough House in 1974 and again in 1986. In 1987 both paintings were donated to the National Gallery of Ireland, before eventually being recovered in 1993.

== Reception ==
The pair of paintings are commonly regarded as some of Metsu's best works. Reviewing an exhibition of works by Metsu in The New York Times in 2011, Karen Rosenberg called them "stunning", and Susan Stamberg of NPR dubbed Man Writing a Letter "one of his most important crowd pleasers" and described the pair as "gorgeously painted with fabulous technique and meticulously rendered details".
