= The Geographer =

1668–1669 painting by Johannes Vermeer

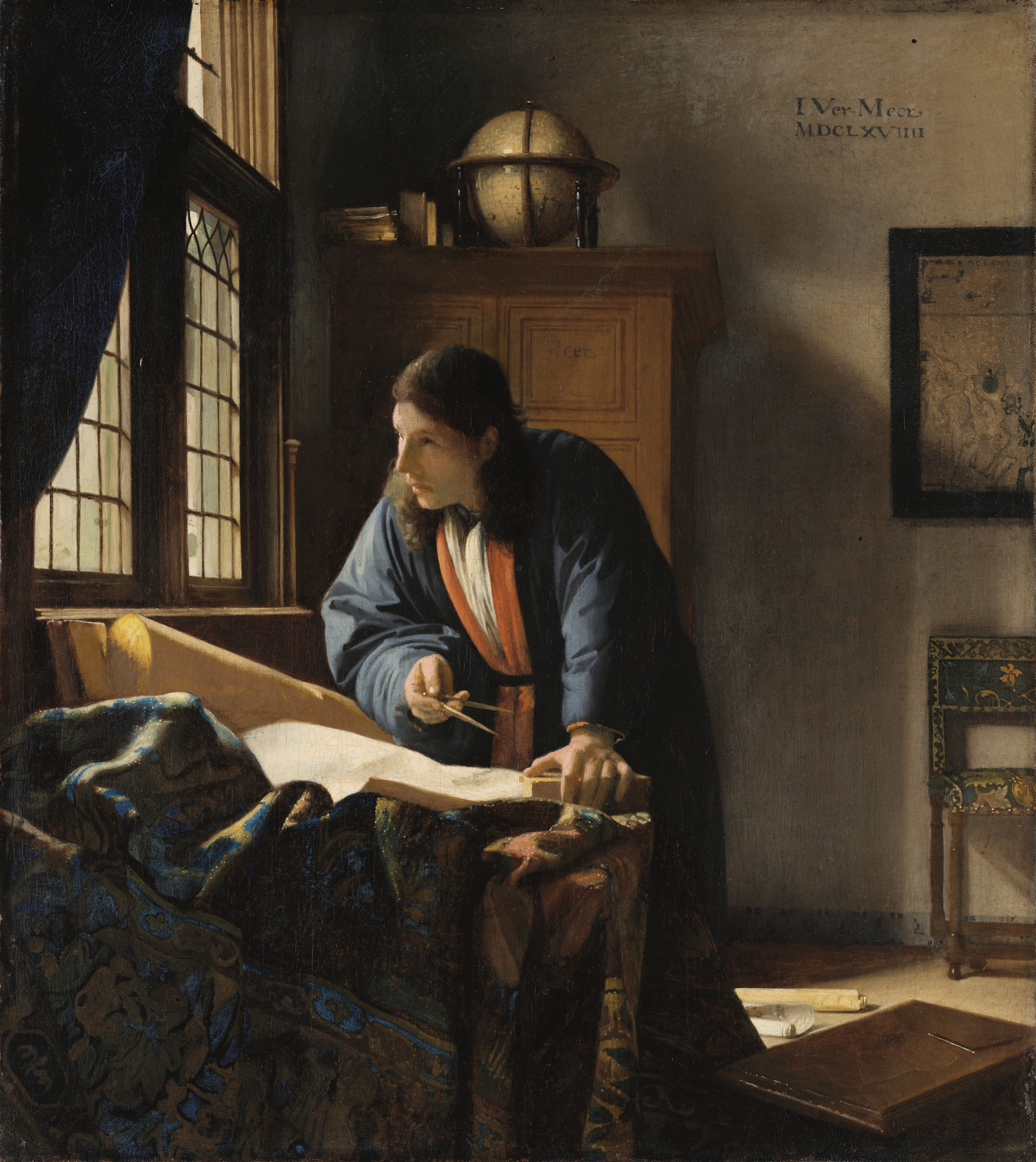
- Artist: Johannes Vermeer
- Year: c. 1668–1669
- Medium: Oil on canvas
- Movement: Dutch Golden Age painting
- Dimensions: 52 cm × 45.5 cm (20 in × 17.9 in)
- Location: Städelsches Kunstinstitut, Frankfurt

The Geographer (Dutch: De geograaf) is a painting created by Dutch artist Johannes Vermeer in 1668–1669, and is now in the collection of the Städel museum in Frankfurt, Germany. It is closely related to Vermeer's The Astronomer, for instance using the same model in the same dress, and has sometimes been considered a pendant painting to it. A 2017 study indicated that the canvas for the two works came from the same bolt of material.

== Description ==
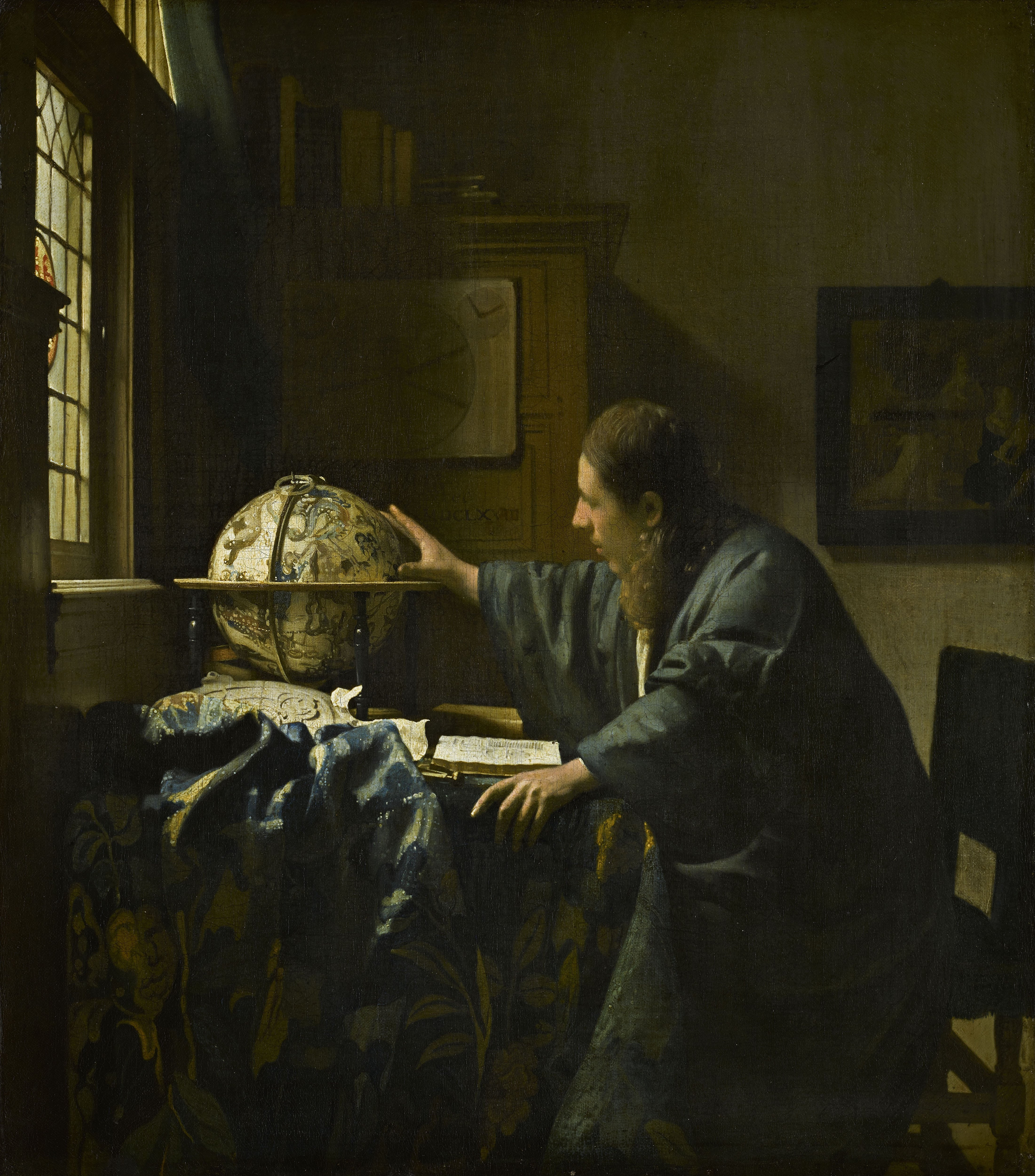
Vermeer's The Astronomer has been considered a pendant to The Geographer

This is one of only three paintings Vermeer signed and dated (the other two are The Astronomer and The Procuress).

The geographer, dressed in a Japanese-style robe then popular among scholars, is shown to be "someone excited by intellectual inquiry", with his active stance, the presence of maps, charts, a globe and books, as well as the dividers he holds in his right hand, according to Arthur K. Wheelock Jr. "The energy in this painting [...] is conveyed most notably through the figure's pose, the massing of objects on the left side of the composition, and the sequence of diagonal shadows on the wall to the right."

Vermeer made several changes that enliven the painting with a sense of vitality: the man's head used to be in a different position, to the left of its present placement, and perhaps looking down rather than peering out the window; the dividers he holds in his hand were originally vertical, not horizontal; a sheet of paper was originally on the small stool at the lower right, and removing it probably made that area darker.

Details of the man's face are slightly blurred, suggesting movement (also a feature of Vermeer's Mistress and Maid), according to Serena Carr. His eyes are narrowed, perhaps squinting in the sunlight or an indication of intense thinking. Carr asserts that the painting depicts a "flash of inspiration," or even "revelation". The drawn curtain on the left and the position of the oriental carpet on the table—pushed back—are both symbols of revelation. "He grips a book as if he's about to snatch it up to corroborate his ideas."

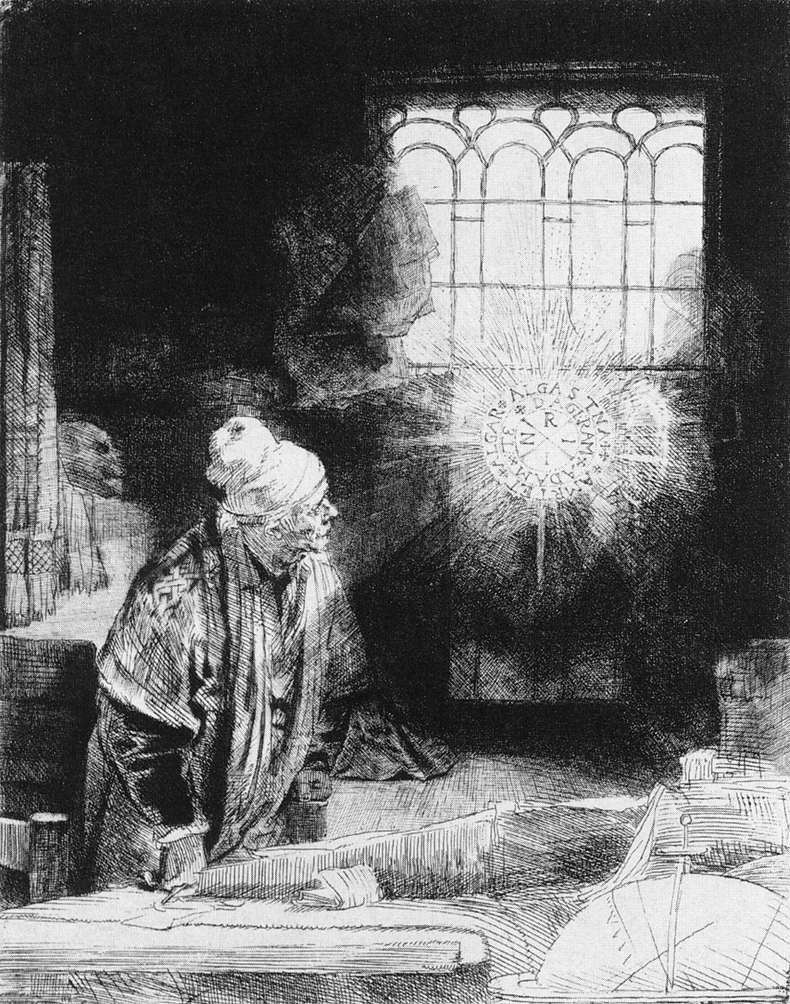
Faust depicted in an etching by Rembrandt (c. 1650). Faust, also a scholar, is depicted in the same pose as The Geographer, although facing in roughly the opposite direction.

The globe was published in Amsterdam in 1618 by Jodocus Hondius. Terrestrial and celestial globes were commonly sold together, and the celestial globe in The Astronomer "was also a Hondius (Hendrick rather than Judocus)", another indication that the two paintings were created as pendant pieces, according to Cant. The globe is turned toward the Indian Ocean, where the Dutch East India Company was then active. Vermeer used an impasto technique to apply pointillé dots, not to indicate light reflected more strongly on certain points but to emphasize the dull ochre cartouche "frame" printed on the globe. Since the globe can be identified, we know the decorative cartouche includes a plea for information for future editions—reflecting the theme of revelation in the painting.

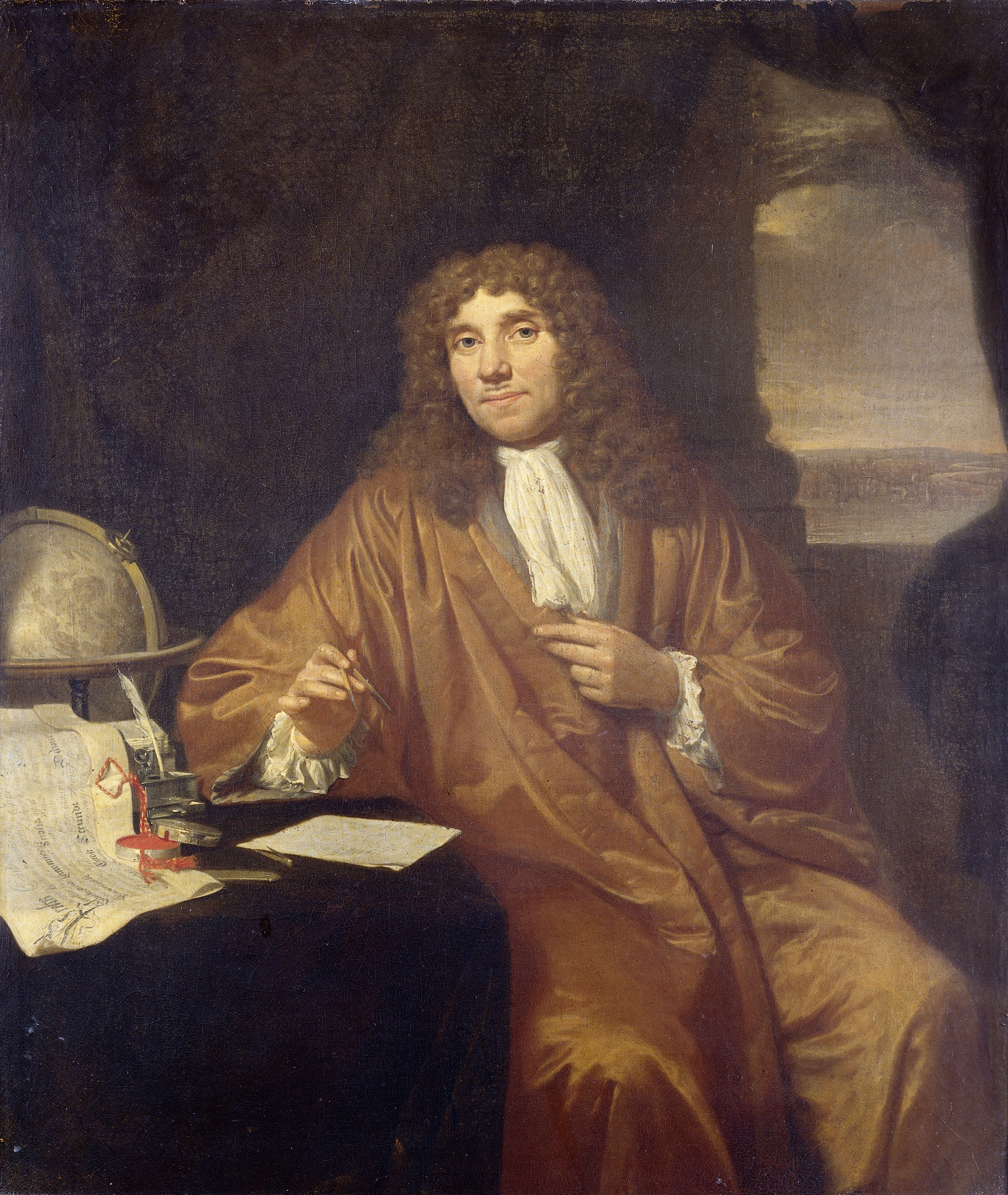
Vermeer's possible model, Anthonie van Leeuwenhoek, painted two decades later by Jan Verkolje

The cartographic objects surrounding the man are some of the actual items a geographer would have: the globe, the dividers the man holds, a cross-staff (hung on the center post of the window), used to measure the angle of celestial objects like the Sun or stars, and the chart the man is using, which, according to one scholar, James A. Welu, appears to be a nautical chart on vellum. The sea chart on the wall of "all the Sea coasts of Europe" has been identified as one published by Willem Jansz. Blaeu. This accuracy indicates Vermeer had a source familiar with the profession. The Astronomer, which seems to form a pendant with this painting, shows a similar, sophisticated knowledge of cartographic instruments and books, and the same young man modeled for both. That man himself may have been the source of Vermeer's correct display of surveying and geographical instruments, and possibly of his knowledge of perspective.

Wheelock and others assert the model/source was probably Antonie van Leeuwenhoek (1632–1723), a contemporary of Vermeer who was also born in Delft. The families of both men were in the textile business, and both families had a strong interest in science and optics. A "microscopist", van Leeuwenhoek was described after his death as being so skilled in "navigation, astronomy, mathematics, philosophy, and natural science ... that one can certainly place him with the most distinguished masteres of the art." Another image of van Leeuwenhoek (by the Delft artist Jan Verkolje) about 20 years later shows a broad face and straight nose, similar to Vermeer's model. At the time Vermeer painted the two works, the scientist would have been about 36 years old. He would have been actively studying for his examination for surveyor, which he passed on 4 February 1669. There is no documentary evidence for any kind of relationship between the two men during Vermeer's lifetime, although in 1676, van Leeuwenhoek was appointed a trustee for Vermeer's estate.

The pose of the figure in Vermeer's painting "takes up precisely the position of Faust in Rembrandt's famous etching" (although facing the opposite direction), according to Lawrence Gowing. Similar arrangements can be found in drawings by Nicolaes Maes.

== Provenance and exhibitions ==
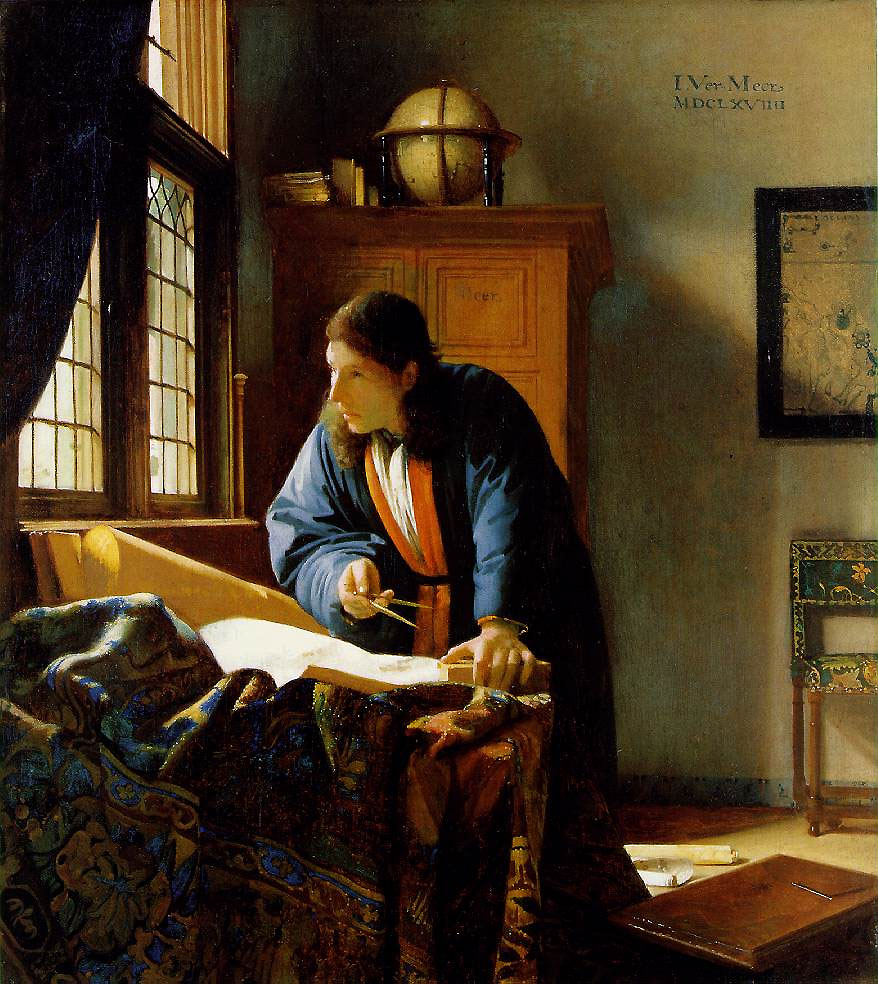
A less-detailed image of the painting, with more accurate coloring

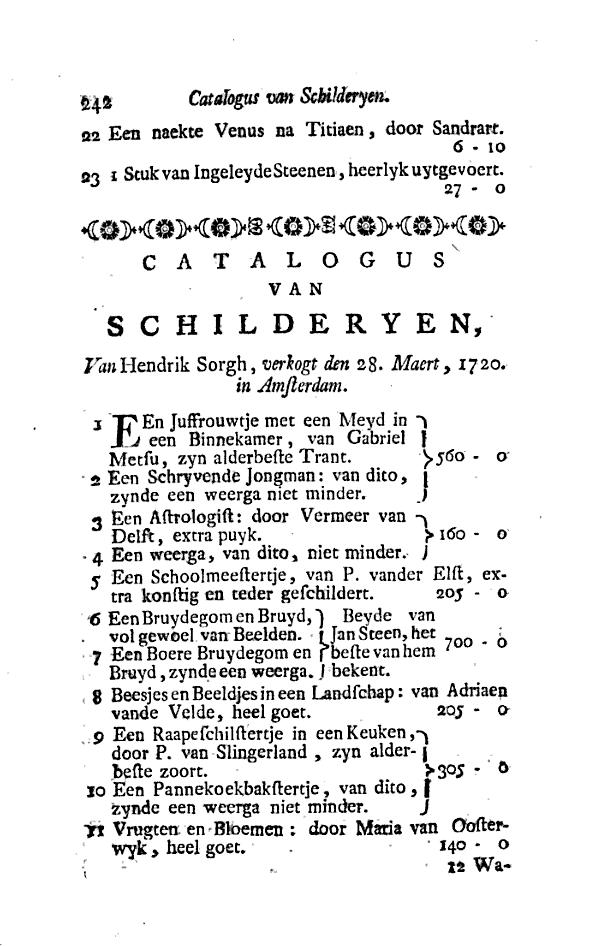
1720 catalog listing the work.

For much of the painting's early history (until 1797), it was owned together with The Astronomer, which it strongly resembles, and the two have long been considered pendants, although their measurements are not identical. The paintings were not among the works in the Dissius sale of 1696, a collection apparently originally owned by the artist's supposed patron, Pieter van Ruijven, and the earliest record of the painting is from 1713. Up until the late 18th century, they were referred to as "Astrologers". The pair were sold by an anonymous owner together in Rotterdam on 27 April 1713 (No. 10 or 11), for 300 florins (a "considerable sum", according to Wheelock). Hendrick Sorgh, an art broker, may have bought the paintings at that point. They were among his effects when he died in 1720, and both were sold on 28 March of that year in Amsterdam (No. 3 or 4 in the sale; for 160 florins; described as "An Astrologer" and "a repeat"). Govert Looten, a neighbor of Sorgh at the Keizersgracht in Amsterdam bought the paintings, which were sold from his estate on 31 March 1729 (this painting was No. 6 and went for 104 florins, both were described in the catalog as "sublimely and artfully painted"). Jacob Crammer Simmonsz of Amsterdam (1725–1778) owned the pair before 1778, hanging them in his home on the Prinsengracht (Simonsz also owned The Lacemaker and another Vermeer, now unknown, depicting a lady pouring wine). He sold The Astronomer and The Geographer together on 25 November of that year to a Huguenot banker, Jean Etiènne Fizeaux of Amsterdam, who owned The Geographer until his death in 1780. His widow owned the work until perhaps 1785. As of 1794 it was owned by Jan Danser Nijman of Amsterdam, who sold it on 16 August 1797, to Christiaan Josi, a publisher of prints, for 133 guilders. It later was bought by Arnoud de Lange of Amsterdam. This transaction separated the two paintings. De Lange sold it on 12 December 1803, for 360 florins.

Sometime before 1821, the painting was owned by Johann Goll van Franckenstein Jr. of Velzen and Amsterdam. Pieter Hendrick Goll van Franckenstein of Amsterdam owned it before 1832, and he sold it on 1 July 1833, for 195 florins to a Nieuwenhuys. It was owned by Alexandre Dumont of Cambrai before 1860, who sold it through Théophile Thoré-Bürger to Isaac Pereire of Paris, who owned it by 1866. It was sold on 6 March 1872. Max Kann of Paris owned the painting, perhaps that year, and it passed into the hands of Pavel Pavlovich Demidov, 2nd Prince of San Donato, near Florence, sometime before 1877, and stayed in his hands until he sold it on 15 March 1880. A.J. Bosch sold the painting in Vienna on 28 April 1885 (for Õs 8,000) to a Kohlbacher, who sold it to the Städel in Frankfurt.

The work was exhibited in the Exposition rétrospective, Tableaux anciens empruntés aux galeries particulières held at the Palais des Champs-Elysées, Paris, 1866; at the exhibition of Ouvrages de peinture exposés au profit de la colonisation de l'Algérie par les Alsaciens-Lorrains, Palais de la Présidence du Corps législatif, Paris, 1874; and in the Vermeer, oorsprong en involved. Fabritius, de Hooch, de Witte exhibition at the Museum Boijmans Van Beuningen in Rotterdam, 1935.

In 1997, The Geographer was displayed alongside its pendant piece, The Astronomer, for a temporary exhibition first at the Louvre, then later at the Städel Museum. This exhibition was the first time the two pieces had been reunited since their separation in 1797.

== See also ==
- Dutch Golden Age painting
- List of paintings by Johannes Vermeer

== Sources ==
- Cant, Serena (2009). Vermeer and His World 1632–1675. Quercus. pp. 126–129. ISBN 978-1-84866-001-4.
- Gowing, Lawrence (1970). Vermeer (2nd ed.). Berkeley and Los Angeles: University of California Press. pp. 148–149. ISBN 0-520-21276-2.
- Wheelock, Arthur K. Jr. (1995). Johannes Vermeer. New Haven: Yale University Press. pp. 170–174. ISBN 0-300-06558-2.
- Wheelock, Arthur Kingsland; Plomp, Michiel Christiaan; Lokin, Daniëlle H. A. C.; Gregory, Quint (2000). The public and the private in the age of Vermeer: exhibition, Osaka municipal museum of art, April 4-July 2, 2000. London: P. Wilson. p. 190. ISBN 978-0-85667-530-0 – via Essential Vermeer.
