= The Astronomer and his Wife =

Painting by Gonzaes Coques

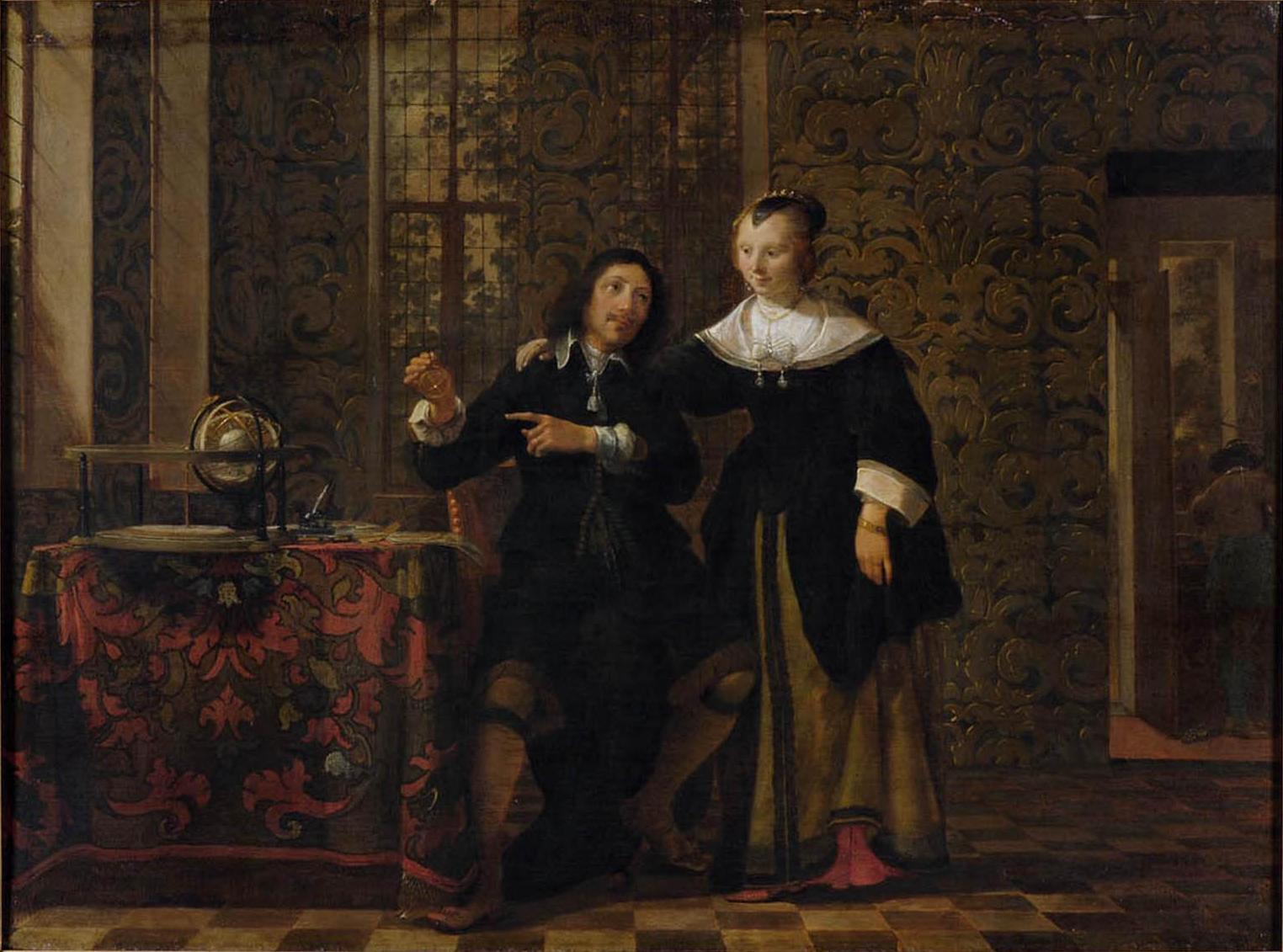
- Artist: Gonzales Coques
- Year: circa 1648–1650
- Medium: oil paint on panel
- Movement: Portrait painting Baroque painting
- Subject: an astronomer and his wife
- Dimensions: 40.5 cm × 54.5 cm (15.9 in × 21.5 in)
- Location: Musée des Beaux-Arts, Strasbourg
- Accession: 1898

The Astronomer and his Wife is a late 1640s oil painting by the Flemish artist Gonzales Coques. It is now in the Musée des Beaux-Arts of Strasbourg, France. Its inventory number is 580.

In 1899, the painting was identified by Georg Dehio as "circle of Gonzales Coques, circa 1648", but already in 1903, the same specialist defined its author as an "anonymous Dutch painter, between 1660 and 1670". This was due to the fact that, based on the supposed nature of the scientific instruments, the male person was identified as the Dutch scientist Christiaan Huygens. It has however been established since that the likeness with Huygens is only superficial, and that the instruments predate Huygens's own. Although some Dutch specialists have suggested that The Astronomer and his Wife may have been painted by Cornelis de Man, the attribution to Gonzales Coques himself is generally accepted since 1938. Stylistic elements do indicate a Dutch influence, Coques having stayed in the Dutch Republic between 1645 and 1648.

== See also ==
- The Astronomer, later painting by Johannes Vermeer
