= Woman Reading a Letter (Metsu) =

Painting by Gabriël Metsu

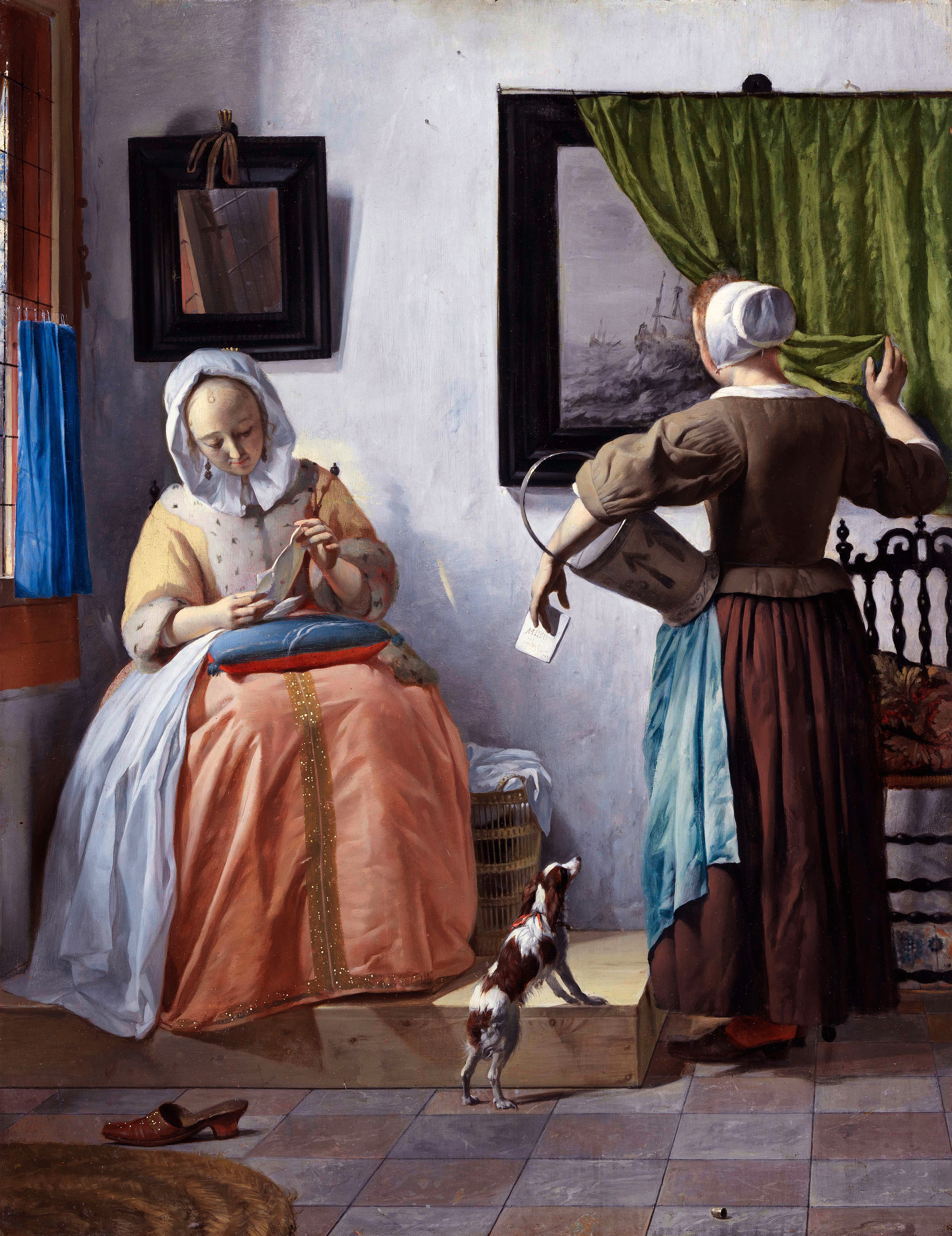
- Artist: Gabriël Metsu
- Year: c. 1665-1667
- Catalogue: NGI.4537
- Type: Oil on wood panel
- Dimensions: 52.5 cm × 40.2 cm (20.7 in × 15.8 in)
- Location: National Gallery of Ireland, Dublin

Woman Reading a Letter is an oil painting by Dutch artist Gabriël Metsu, created c. 1665–1667, shortly before his death. During his lifetime, under the Golden Age of Dutch painting, Metsu was a renowned painter, much better known than Vermeer. This painting is assumed to be a pair with Man Writing a Letter.

The pair of paintings are regarded as some of Metsu's best-known works; Metsu got the idea of a pair of themed paintings from Gerard ter Borch, who had painted a similar pair. It has been in the collection of the National Gallery of Ireland, in Dublin, since 1987.

== Description ==
A woman is reading a letter, seated by a window with a blue curtain. She is dressed elegantly in a yellow jacket with an expensive collar of ermine, and a skirt of peach-colored silk; there is gold trim on both the skirt and the elegant shoe she has kicked off. The red and blue embroidery pillow on her lap and the sewing basket next to her show that she put her needlework aside to read the letter. Beside her, a maid in dark clothing is drawing aside a curtain in front of a painting of a naval scene in an ebony frame. Visual clues would have made it immediately apparent to Metsu's contemporaries that the letter is a love letter. The little spaniel symbolizes fidelity and loyalty, the Cupid's arrows on the bucket and the maid's old shoes symbolize love and hope for a safe return.

The painting, showing a stormy sea, could refer to a tumultuous relationship or indicate that the loved one is on the sea. A final, striking detail is found in the letter the maid is holding: it is addressed to the painter.

Woman Reading a Letter is a companion piece to Man Writing a Letter, in which the young man is writing the letter. Records indicate the paintings have always been owned as a pair. Metsu likely got the idea for a pair of themed paintings from Gerard ter Borch, who had painted a similar pair, An Officer Writing a Letter and Woman sealing a letter, but the influence of Johannes Vermeer is also unmistakable in the paintings themselves.

== History ==
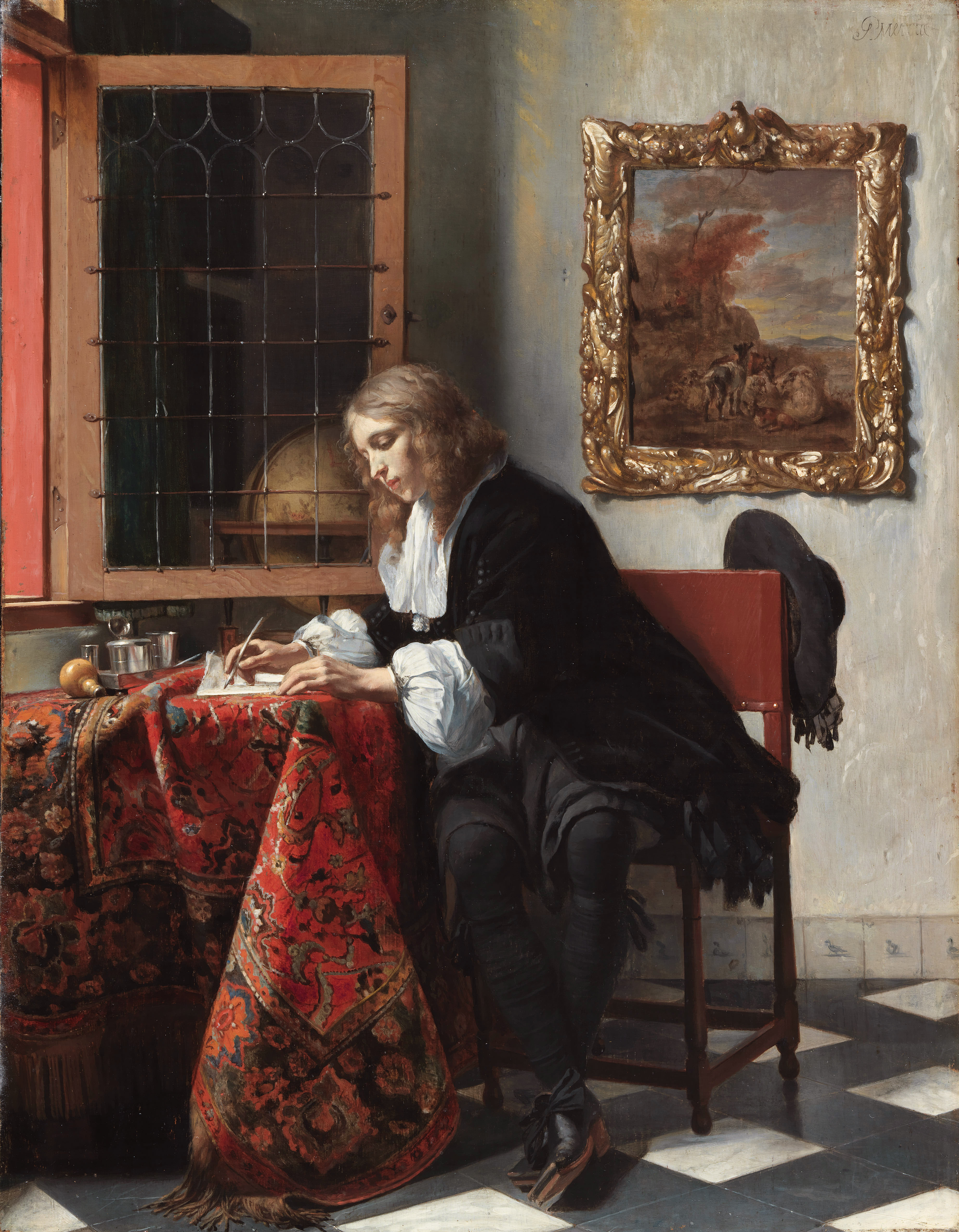
Man Writing a Letter

The pair of paintings were owned by Hendrick Sorgh, a broker in Amsterdam. After his death they were sold for 560 guilders on 28 March 1720 to George Bruyn. After he in turn died they were sold on 16 March 1724 for 785 guilders to Johannes Coop, a wealthy cotton printer and dyer. Approximately between 1744 and 1750, for 500 guilders, they came into the possession of Gerrit Braamcamp, a collector who owned no fewer than ten works by Metsu; his heirs benefited from the artist's popularity. On 31 July 1771 the two paintings were bought for 5,205 guilders by Jan Hope. They would descend to Lord Francis Pelham Clinton Hope, who sold them in 1898 as part of a collection of Dutch and Flemish paintings that was purchased by the art dealers A. Wertheimer and P. & D. Colnaghi. The pair of paintings were inherited by Sir Alfred Beit, of London and Blessington. Both were among artworks stolen from Russborough House in 1974 and again in 1986, but were eventually recovered. In 1987 both paintings were donated to the National Gallery of Ireland, though they remained missing until 1993.

== Reception ==
The pair of paintings are commonly regarded as some of Metsu's best work; reviewing an exhibition of works by Metsu in The New York Times in 2011, Karen Rosenberg called them "stunning", and Susan Stamberg of NPR described them as "gorgeously painted with fabulous technique and meticulously rendered details".
