= Hope Collection of Pictures =

The Hope Collection of Pictures of the Dutch and Flemish Schools
- The Hope Collection of Pictures; 1898 catalogue

The Hope Collection of Pictures, also known as The Hope Collection of Pictures of the Dutch and Flemish Schools, was a distinguished group of eighty-three paintings that were sold together in 1898 by Lord Francis Pelham Clinton-Hope. It included works by more than thirty different artists, a number of them being individuals whose names are renowned within the art world.

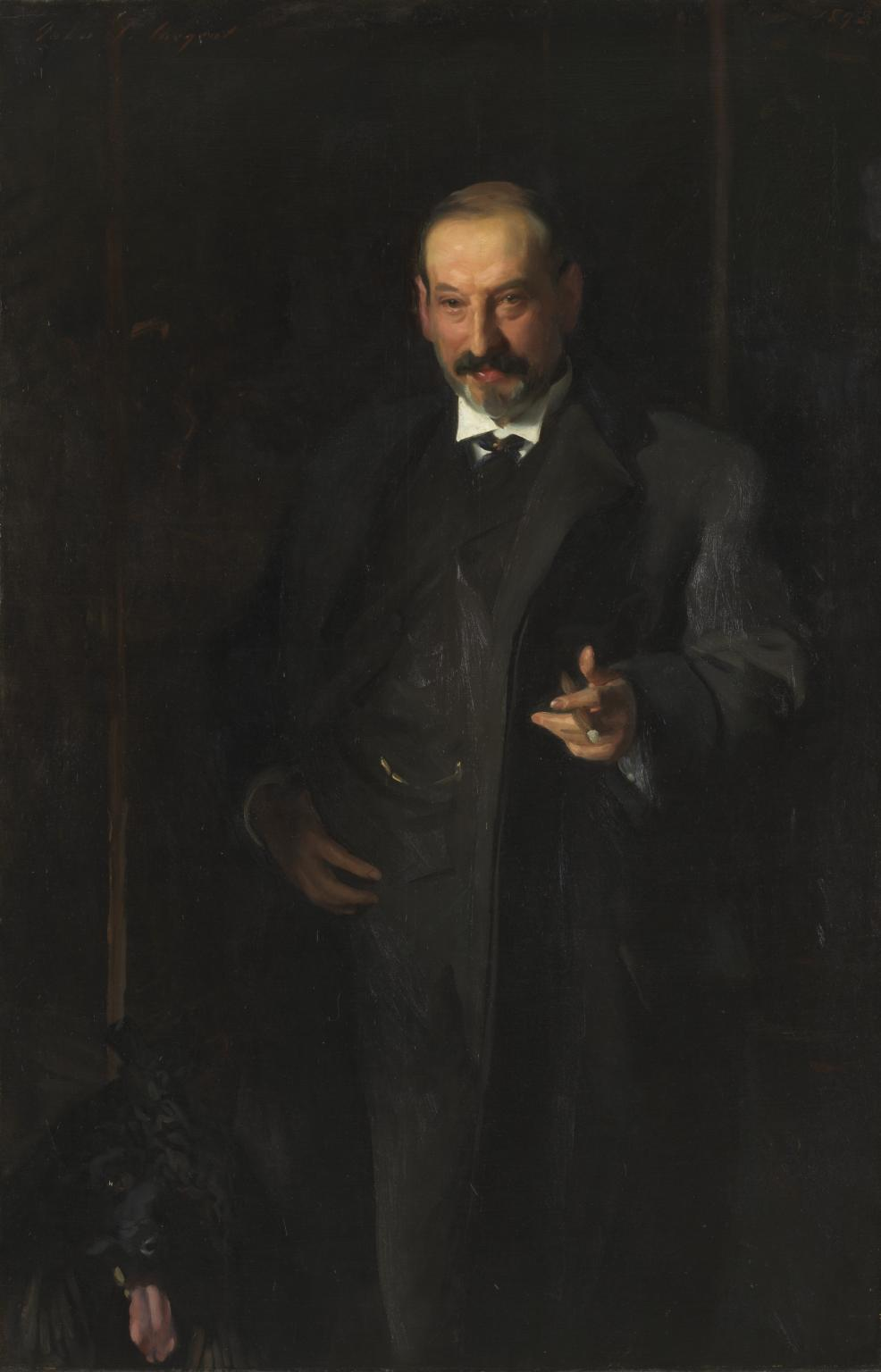
Asher Wertheimer John Singer Sargent, 1898

== History ==
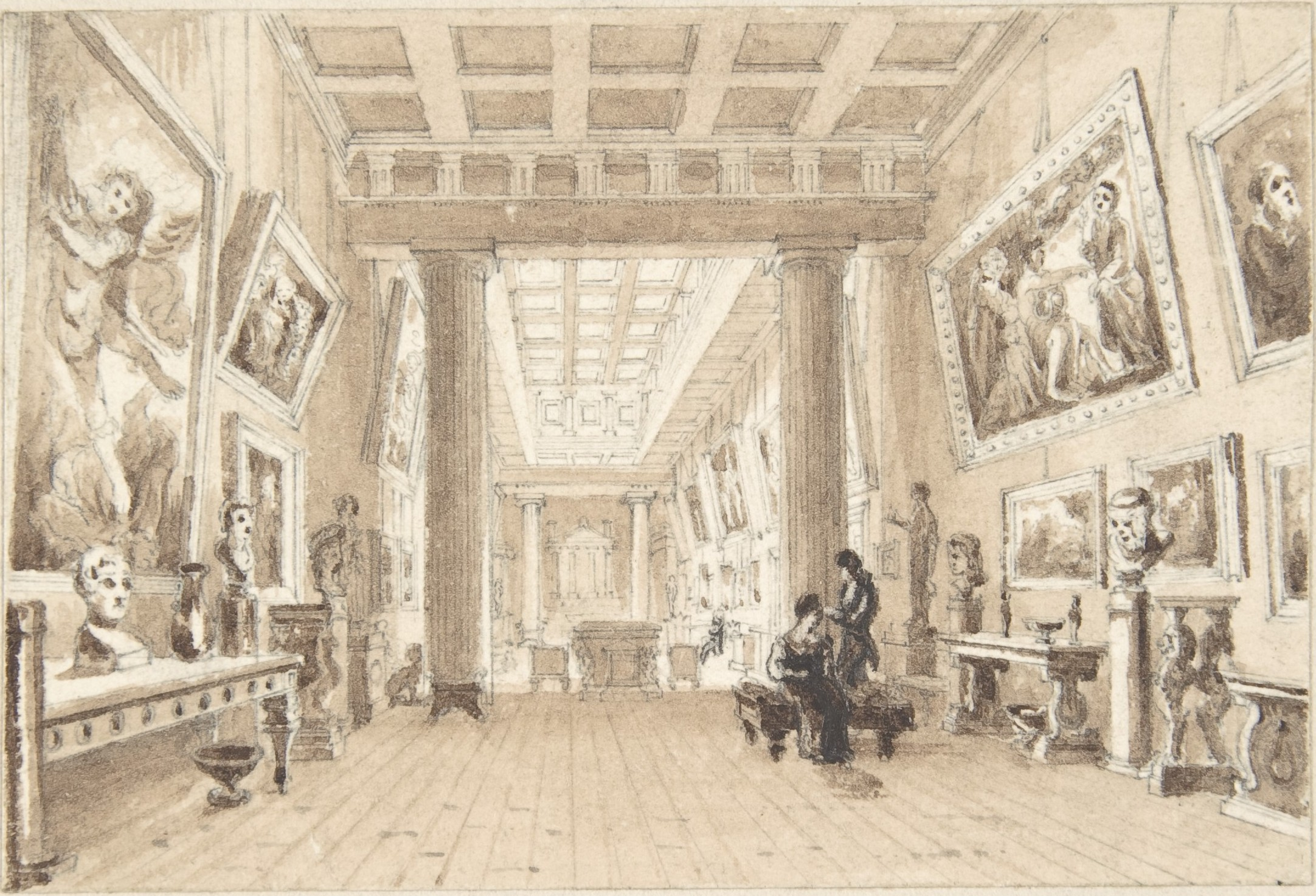
Interior of Thomas Hope's Picture Gallery, Duchess Street, London William Henry Bartlett, 1825–54

Multiple members of the branch of the Hope family which became established in Amsterdam pursued an interest in acquiring fine paintings. By the later part of the 18th century they owned a large number of works, and 372 of their paintings accompanied Henry Hope when he moved from the Dutch Republic to London in 1794. An inventory with insured values of the paintings at his home in England was compiled not long afterwards on 17 December 1795. He would continue to purchase works, (Note: An example of a painting that was purchased by Henry Hope after he had moved to London is Christ and the Adulterous Woman by Peter Paul Rubens.) and upon his death a cumulative total of at least 378 paintings that had been in his possession were sold through three Christie’s auctions that were held in April 1811, June 1816, and July 1816. (Note: According to the Sales Contents data on the Getty Provenance Index® website as of July 2022, these three auctions involved a cumulative total of 395 paintings, of which 378 of the transactions are recorded as Sold, 9 as Bought In, and 2 each as Passed, Withdrawn, Unknown, and Sold [?].)

This particular collection was a subset of a group of paintings that came to be owned by Henry Thomas Hope following the deaths of his father Thomas Hope and his uncle Henry Philip Hope. Henry Thomas Hope was one of a handful of individuals who were initially contacted regarding making a loan to the 1857 Manchester Art Treasures exhibition, and twelve of his paintings would be sent to Manchester. Following his death in 1862, the collection was inherited by his widow, Anne Adèle Hope. In 1891 the eighty-three painting were put on display at the South Kensington Museum, before they would be sold seven years later by her grandson for the sum of £121,550. The payment of this amount was made by the London art dealer Asher Wertheimer.

While substantial, the paintings sold in 1898 were not the full Hope Collection. Some works were sold privately to Agnew's in 1910, including Paolo Veronese's Allegory of Virtue and Vice and Allegory of Wisdom and Strength and Nicolas Poussin's The Inspiration of the Poet. A residual portion was sold at Christie's in 1917.

== Works ==
Following is a partial listing of the paintings that were in The Hope Collection of Pictures of the Dutch and Flemish Schools.
(Those with a (†) preceding their title were on display at the 1857 Manchester Art Treasures exhibition.)

| Image | Title | Artist | Collection |
|---|---|---|---|
| | (†) A Lady with a Parrot and a Gentleman with a Monkey | Caspar Netscher | Columbus Museum of Art |
| | Christ in the Storm on the Sea of Galilee | Rembrandt | Isabella Stewart Gardner Museum |
| | (†) River Landscape Near a Town | unknown Netherlandish artist | Musée Charles de Bruyères (in Remiremont) |
| | A Church Interior with Elegant Company Attending a Christening | Dirck van Delen | private |
| | The Farm | Adriaen van de Velde | Gemäldegalerie |
| | The Vegetable Seller | Willem van Mieris | Musée Bernard d'Agesci (in Niort) |
| | (†) Easy Come, Easy Go | Jan Steen | Museum Boijmans Van Beuningen |
| | Bathsheba | Willem van Mieris | Snite Museum of Art |
| | The Onion Seller | Willem van Mieris | Musée Bernard d'Agesci (in Niort) |
| | A young woman holding a hare with a boy at a window | Gerrit Dou | private |
| | View from the Coast of Norway | Jacob van Ruisdael | Calouste Gulbenkian Museum |
| | (†) Figures with Horses by a Stable | Paulus Potter | Philadelphia Museum of Art |
| | Italianate Landscape with Cattle | Karel Dujardin | Mauritshuis |
| | (†) The Robbery | Simon Kick | Gemäldegalerie |
| | The Church at Maarssen | Jan van der Heyden | National Trust (at Polesden Lacey) |
| | Man and a Page Offering Fruit to a Seated Woman, In a Courtyard | Jan van Mieris | private |
| | Cows and Herdsman by a River | Aelbert Cuyp | Frick Collection |
| | The Dancing Couple | Jan Steen | National Gallery of Art |
| | (†) The Old Violinist | Frans van Mieris the Elder | Rose-Marie and Eijk van Otterloo Collection, Museum of Fine Arts, Boston |
| | Landscape with Tower | Peter Paul Rubens | Gemäldegalerie |
| | Landscape with Bridge, Cattle, and Figures | Jacob van Ruisdael | Clark Art Institute |
| | (†) Cattle and Sheep in a Stormy Landscape | Paulus Potter | National Gallery |
| | Woman Drinking with Soldiers (French: La Buveuse) | Pieter de Hooch | Louvre |
| | The Death of Cleopatra | Gerard de Lairesse | Art Gallery of Ontario |
| | Cottages in a Wood | Meindert Hobbema | National Gallery |
| | (†) Elegant Couple in an Interior | Eglon van der Neer | private |
| | Woman Reading a Letter | Gabriël Metsu | National Gallery of Ireland |
| | Lot and his Daughters | Adriaen van der Werff | Schlossmuseum Gotha (within Friedenstein Castle) |
| | Swans and Peacocks | Melchior d'Hondecoeter | Museu Nacional de Belas Artes |
| | Woman Asleep | Gerrit Dou | Hohenbuchau Collection, on permanent loan to Liechtenstein. The Princely Collections |
| | Street in Front of the Haarlem Gate in Amsterdam | Jan van der Heyden | Gemäldegalerie |
| | Two Ladies with a Parrot at a Casement | Philip van Dijk | private |
| | Still Life with Swan and Game before a Country Estate | Jan Weenix | National Gallery of Art |
| | A Dutch Three-Master and a Boeier in Stormy Weather | Willem van de Velde the Younger | National Trust (at Buckland Abbey) |
| | Doubting Thomas (The Incredulity of St. Thomas) | Adriaen van der Werff | Milwaukee Art Museum |
| | The Glass of Wine | Johannes Vermeer | Gemäldegalerie |
| | Three Soldiers Making Merry | Gerard ter Borch | private |
| | Landscape with kermis (or The Rustic Wedding) | Philips Wouwerman | Mansion House, London |
| | Roman Market Scene | Johannes Lingelbach | Staatliche Kunsthalle Karlsruhe |
| | Man Writing a Letter | Gabriël Metsu | National Gallery of Ireland |
| | A Guardroom Scene with Tric-Trac Players in the Foreground | David Teniers the Younger | private |
| | (†) A Lady and Gentleman in Black | Rembrandt | Isabella Stewart Gardner Museum |
| | An Italian Landscape | Jan Both | National Gallery of Ireland |
| | Dutch Shipping in a Heavy Swell with a Small Hoeker | Willem van de Velde the Younger | National Trust (at Buckland Abbey) |
| | The Virgin as Intercessor | Anthony van Dyck | National Gallery of Art |
| | View of the Roman Forum | Jacob van der Ulft | Schloss Collection, looted during World War II |
| | Officer Writing a Letter, with a Trumpeter | Gerard ter Borch | Philadelphia Museum of Art |
| | The Christening | Jan Steen | Gemäldegalerie |
| | The Music Lesson | workshop of Gerard ter Borch | Isabella Stewart Gardner Museum |
| | (†) The Cottage Dooryard | Adriaen van Ostade | National Gallery of Art |
| | Landscape with Cattle | Adriaen van de Velde | Philadelphia Museum of Art |
| | Old Woman Peeling Apples | Nicolaes Maes | Gemäldegalerie |
| | A Lady at Her Toilet | Gabriël Metsu | Frick Collection |

== Sources ==
- Manchester Art Treasures Exhibition (1857). Catalogue of the Art Treasures of the United Kingdom. London: Bradbury and Evans.
- South Kensington Museum (1869). Catalogue of Pictures of the Dutch and Flemish Schools. London: George E. Eyre and William Spottiswoode.
- South Kensington Museum (1891). A Catalogue of Pictures of the Dutch and Flemish Schools. London: Eyre and Spottiswoode.
- Wertheimer, Asher, ed. (1898). The Hope Collection of Pictures. London: Chiswick Press.
- Wheelock, Arthur K. Jr. (2004). Gerard Ter Borch. Washington, D.C.: National Gallery of Art. ISBN 0-89468-317-9.
- Vander Auwera, Joost (2007). Rubens: A Genius at Work. Tielt: Lannoo. ISBN 978-90-209-7242-9.
- Liedtke, Walter (2008). Vermeer: The Complete Paintings. New York, NY: Abrams. ISBN 978-1-4197-0308-9.
- Pergam, Elizabeth A. (2011). The Manchester Art Treasures Exhibition of 1857: Entrepreneurs, Connoisseurs and the Public. London and New York, NY: Routledge. ISBN 978-1-4094-1830-6.
- Hall, Michael; Gifford, Clare (2012). The Harold Samuel Collection: A Guide to the Dutch and Flemish Pictures at the Mansion House. London: Paul Holberton publishing. ISBN 978-1-907372-41-4.
- The Frick Collection (2016). Handbook of Paintings. New York, NY: Scala Arts Publishers, Inc. ISBN 978-1-85759-328-0.
- Waiboer, Adriaan E., ed. (2017). Vermeer and the Masters of Genre Painting. New Haven and London: Yale University Press. ISBN 978-0-300-22293-7.
