= The Astronomer =

Painting by Johannes Vermeer c. 1668

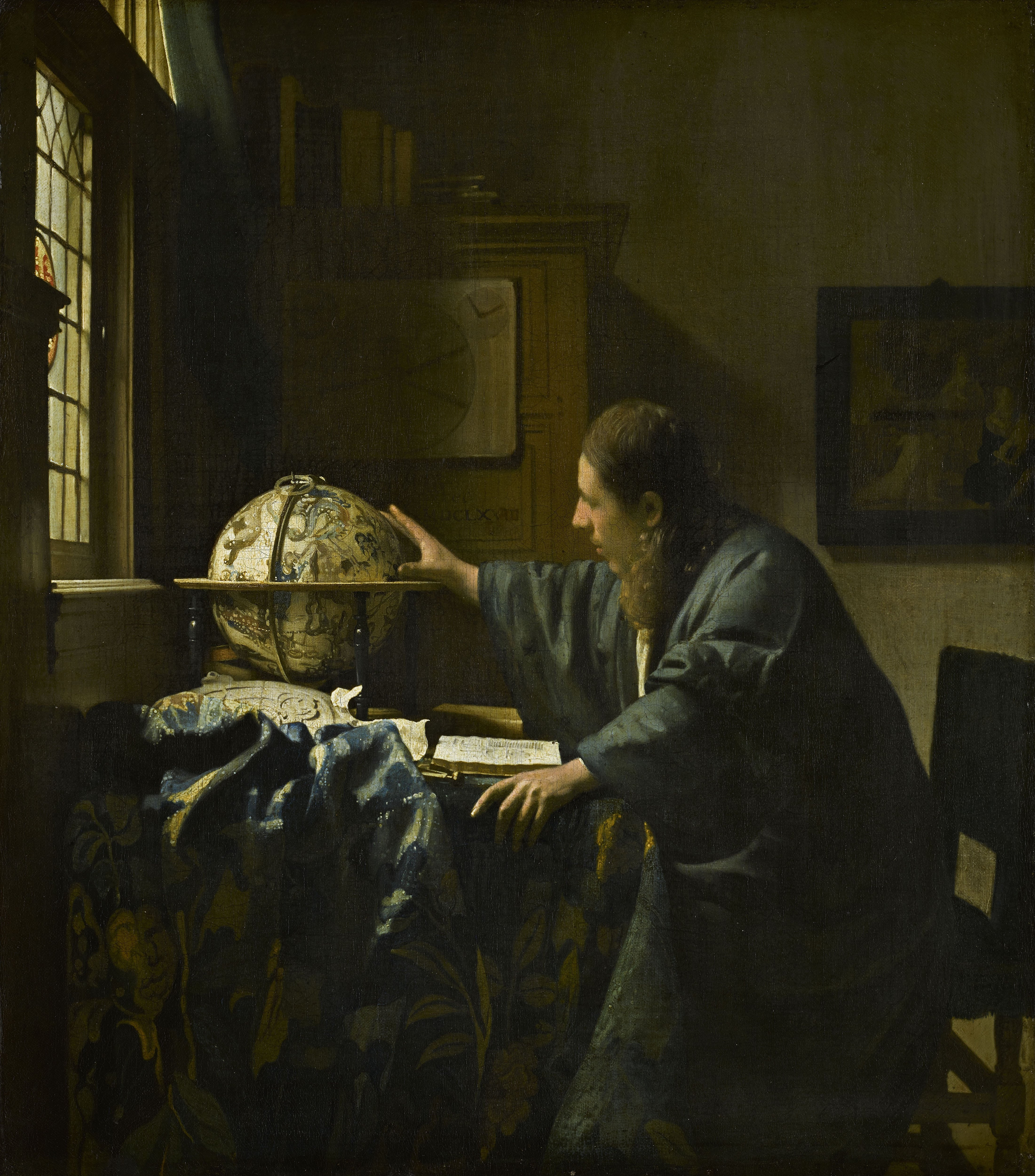
- Artist: Johannes Vermeer
- Year: 1668
- Medium: Oil on canvas
- Movement: Dutch Golden Age painting
- Dimensions: 51 cm × 45 cm (20 in × 18 in)
- Location: Musée du Louvre, Paris

The Astronomer (Dutch: De astronoom) is an oil-on-canvas painting that was completed in 1668 by Johannes Vermeer, a painter of the Dutch Golden Age. Measuring 51 cm × 45 cm (20 in × 18 in), The Astronomer is now in the collection of the Louvre in Paris.

== Description ==
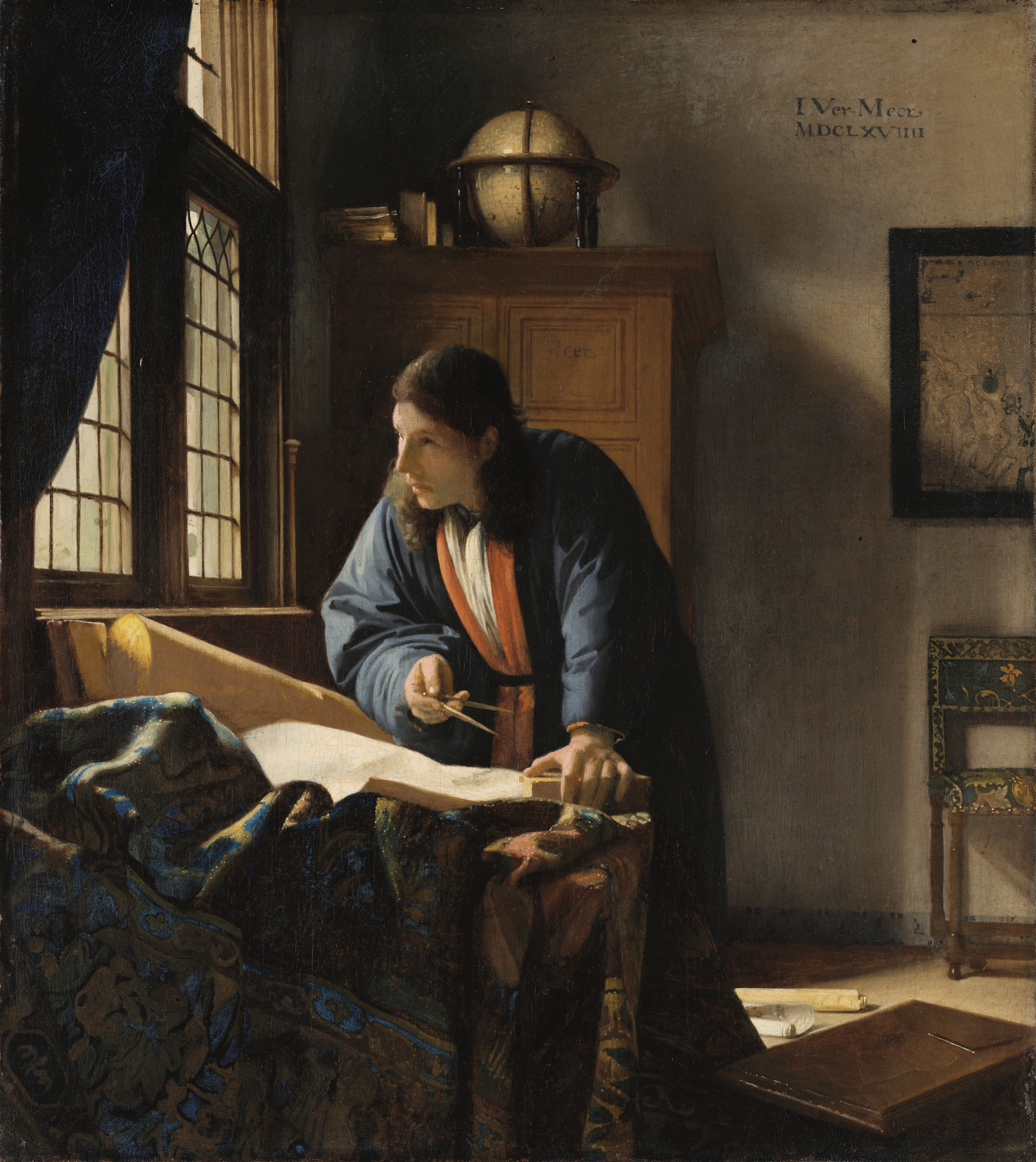
Johannes Vermeer, The Geographer 1668–69 oil on canvas; 53×47 cm. Steadelsches Kunstinstitut, Frankfurt, Germany. The Geographer used the same model and other elements as The Astronomer.

Portrayals of scientists were a favourite topic in 17th-century Dutch painting and Vermeer's oeuvre includes both this astronomer and the slightly later The Geographer. Both are believed to portray the same man, possibly Antonie van Leeuwenhoek. A 2017 study indicated that the canvas for the two works came from the same bolt of material, confirming their close relationship. It has been proposed that Vermeer used a camera obscura as an aid to reconstruct the geometry of the rooms and the objects in his paintings. Both paintings portray the same room and furniture, slightly rearranged.

The painting shows an astronomer looking at a globe. The astronomer's profession is shown by the celestial globe (version by Jodocus Hondius) and the book on the table, the 1621 edition of Adriaan Metius's Institutiones Astronomicae Geographicae. Symbolically, the volume is open to Book III, a section advising the astronomer to seek "inspiration from God," and the painting on the wall shows the Finding of Moses—Moses may represent knowledge and science ("learned in all the wisdom of the Egyptians"). It is notable that a telescope is absent from the scene; Jacob Metius is credited by his brother, Adriaan Metius, as the inventor of the telescope. Art historian Julian Jason Haladyn has suggested that this conveys interiority.

== Provenance and history ==
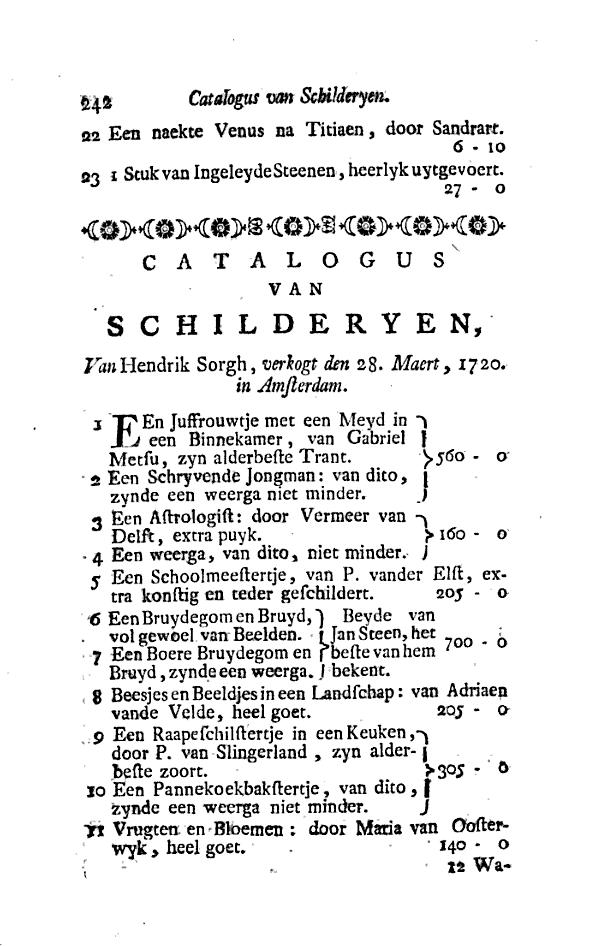
1720 catalog listing the work.

The provenance of The Astronomer can be traced back to the 27th of April 1713, when it was sold at the Rotterdam sale of an unknown collector (possibly Adriaen Paets or his father, of Rotterdam) together with The Geographer. The presumed buyer was Hendrik Sorgh, whose estate sale held in Amsterdam on the 28ty of March 1720 included both The Astronomer and The Geographer, which were described as 'Een Astrologist: door Vermeer van Delft, extra puyk' ('An Astrologist by Vermeer of Delft, top-notch') and 'Een weerga, van ditto, niet minder' ('Similar by ditto, no less'). Until 1800, The Astronomer and The Geographer had always accompanied each other. This was because they were considered to be pendants due to their similar subject matters and dates of composition being closely related. Between 1881 and 1888, the painting was sold by the Paris art dealer Léon Gauchez to the banker and art collector Alphonse James de Rothschild. It was then brought to London for his private collection where it became part of the Rothschild family fortune. It was a prized possession carefully being passed down and inherited by his son Édouard Alphonse James de Rothschild after his death.

The painting would be seized at Édouard de Rothschild’s home by the Nazi Einsatzstab Reichsleiter Rosenberg (ERR) in 1940 for the occupied territories after the German invasion of France. This was apart of a operation where thousands of paintings, sculptors and drawings were seized and bought, often using force, and sent to Germany. This operation was due to Hitlers constant increasing interest in the States control over artworks. In his autobiographical book Mein Kampf, he would violently criticize modern art (cubism, futurism, dadism) where he would write that they were “products of degenerate minds” and go on to argue that it was the “duty of the State, and of its leaders, to prevent a people from falling under the influence of spiritual madness.” It was taken to the Jeu de Paume museum and declared “Property of the Third Reich” by a team of German art historians and officials. The paintings value was estimated and a small swastika was stamped on the back of the painting in black ink. It, along with hundreds of other works of art, would be sent by a special train from Paris to Germany. It was considered to be among the works of highest historical and artistic value in the Nazi inventory.

On the 3rd of November 1940, Alfred Rosenberg would send Martin Bormann a note in which he expressed satisfaction with the seizure of The Astronomer where he wrote;

In great haste, the report to the führer, included herein, will I believe bring him great joy — I am pleased moreover to inform the führer that the painting by Jan Vermeer of Delft [sic], to which he made mention, has been found among the works confiscated from the Rotachild’s

— Alfred Rosenberg

It would be added to the private collection of Adolf Hitler where he would covet the painting as his intent in art and the states control over it constantly increased. In his will during the final hours of his life before his suicide on the 30th of April 1945, he would express his wants of this painting to become the center piece of a new museum he hoped to be built in his hometown writing;

The paintings in my collections, which I purchased over the course of years, were not assembled for any personal gain, but for the creation of a messing in my native city of Linz on the Danube. It is my most sincere wish that this legacy be duly executed

— Adolf Hitler, 30, April 1945

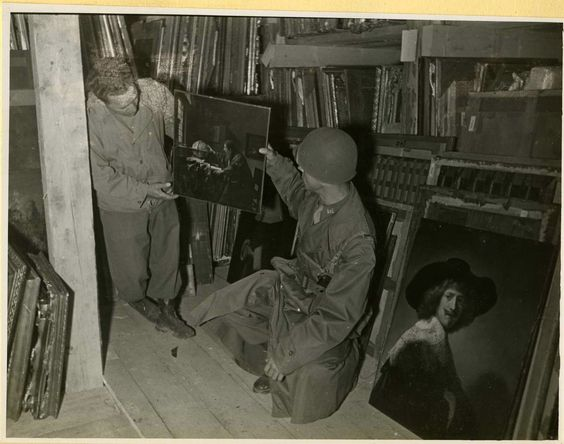
The Astronomer being found by the Monuments Men in a Nazi art storage site after the Second World War.

The painting was returned to the Rothschilds after the war, and was acquired by the French state as giving in payment of inheritance taxes in 1983 and then exhibited at the Louvre since 1983. In 1997, The Astronomer was displayed alongside its pendant piece, The Geographer, for a temporary exhibition first at the Louvre, then later at the Städel Museum. This exhibition was the first time the two pieces had been reunited since their separation in 1797.

== See also ==
- List of paintings by Johannes Vermeer
- The Astronomer and his Wife, earlier painting by Gonzales Coques
