= Van Honthorst =

Van Honthorst is a Dutch surname. Notable people with this name include:-

- Gerard van Honthorst (1592-1656), artist
- Willem van Honthorst (1594-1666), artist

It was also the name of a Dutch steamship.

- SS Van Honthorst, in service 1943-46
