= SS Stad Schiedam =

Two ships of Halcyon Lijn NV were named Stad Schiedam after the Dutch town.

- SS Stad Schiedam (1911), sunk by an onboard explosion in September 1940
- SS Stad Schiedam (1942), in service 1946–61
