= Smiling Girl, a Courtesan, Holding an Obscene Image =

1625 painting by Gerrit van Honthorst

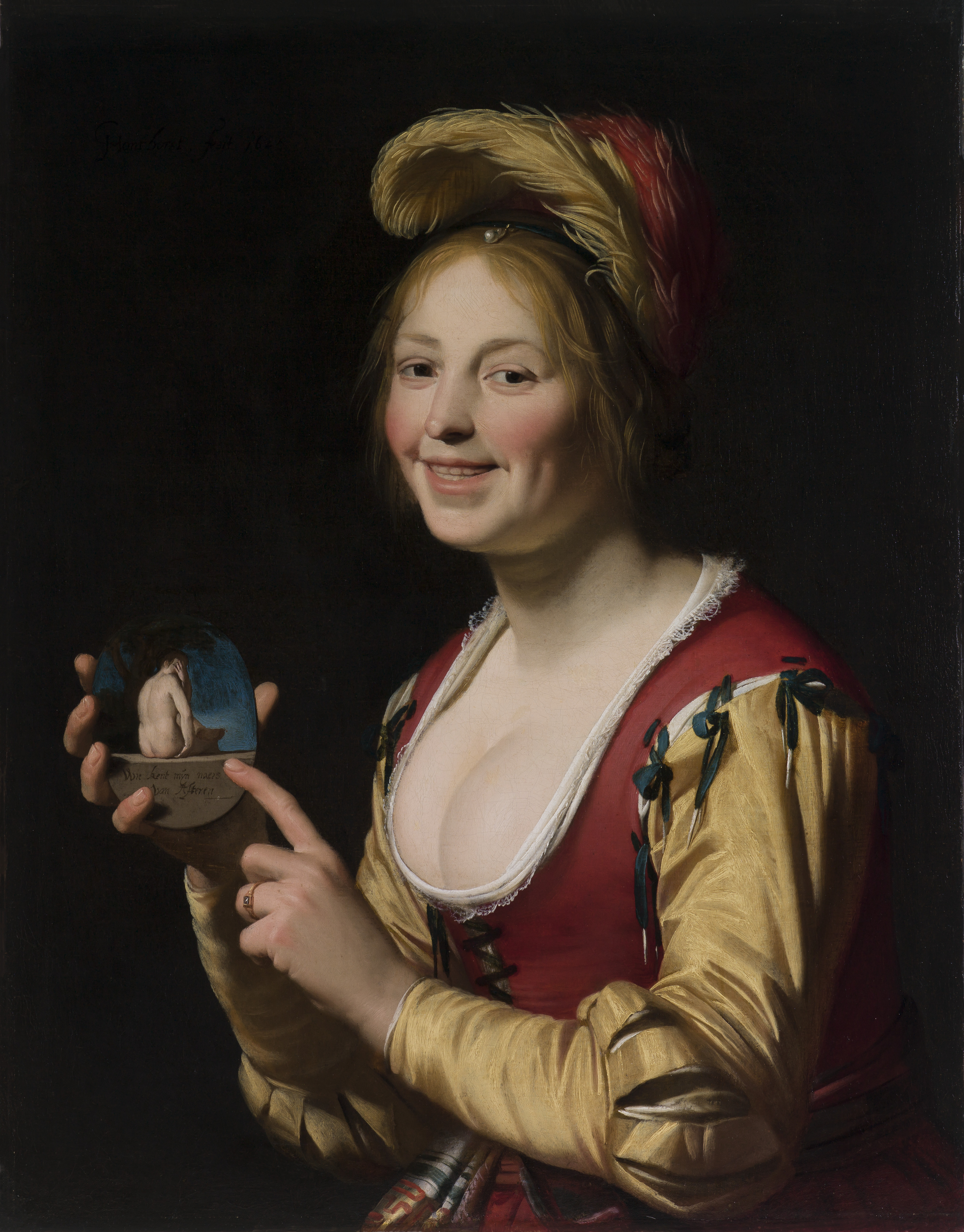
Smiling Girl, a Courtesan, Holding an Obscene Image (1625) by Gerard van Honthorst

Smiling Girl, a Courtesan, Holding an Obscene Image, also known in Dutch as Een Laggende Vrouw met een naakte Pourtraitje in de Hand, waar onder divisje staat ("A laughing woman holding a small picture of a nude in her hand, under which is a motto") or Jonge vrouw met een medaillon ("Young Woman with a Medallion"), is an oil painting on canvas by Gerard van Honthorst, created in 1625. It is held in the Saint Louis Art Museum where it is on view in Gallery 236.

It depicts a prostitute dressed in gold and red clothing and pointing at a medallion she is holding up; the medallion depicts a seated naked woman, perhaps the same one, obscuring her face with her hand and captioned in Dutch Wie kent mĳn naers van Afteren ("Who can recognize my backside from behind?"). The form of the ĳ in 'mijn' is as a y with an acute accent. She is likely using this medallion to advertise her services, as this was a typical practice of the sex industry in the Netherlands during the Eighty Years' War.

It is thought that the sitter is the same as that in De koppelaarster, painted in the same year.

== Provenance ==
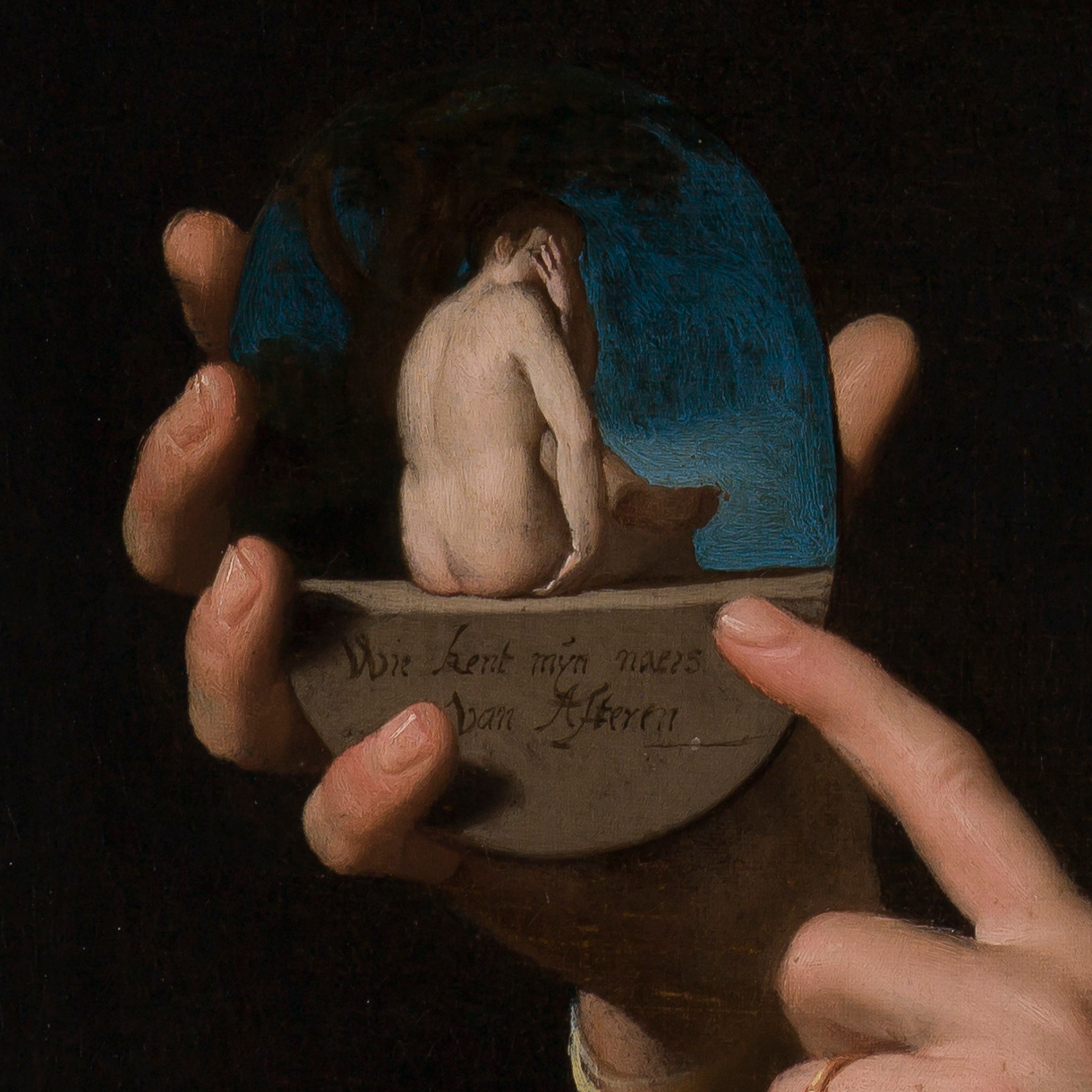
Detail

In 1765, the painting was sold at an auction of the G. Van Oostrum collection in The Hague. It was later owned by William Craven, 2nd Earl of Craven and stored at Coombe Abbey in Coventry, England, and then purchased by Colnaghi & Scott. By 1864 it had been inherited by John Anthony Scott and his mother Caroline Colnaghi in London, and thence to Charles Roots in Hereford by 1922, who sold it that year to W. J. Davies. It was at this point that the painter was identified, a fact which had been lost over the prior centuries. Greville Phillips inherited it from Davies in 1929, and by 1931 it was in the Baliol Collection. Subsequent owners included Francis A. Drey, and by 1954 Adolph Loewi, Inc. of Los Angeles, from whom the Saint Louis Art Museum purchased it.

== Style ==
Van Honthorst painted the portrait several years after he returned to Utrecht from Italy in 1620. In terms of style, the painting clearly shows the influence of Caravaggio, particularly in the use of chiaroscuro. The heavily lit face and cleavage of the woman contrast with an entirely dark background. Through an extremely skillful use of shadows and a balanced colour composition, the artist creates three-dimensionality and a sense of presence. The effect is strongly realistic, with a characteristic elegance, without rawness. As a painter, van Honthorst is considered a member of the Utrecht Caravaggism movement, of which this painting is a typical example.

== See also ==
- Tart card
