= Adoration of the Christ Child (Honthorst) =

Painting by Gerard van Honthorst

Adoration of the Child
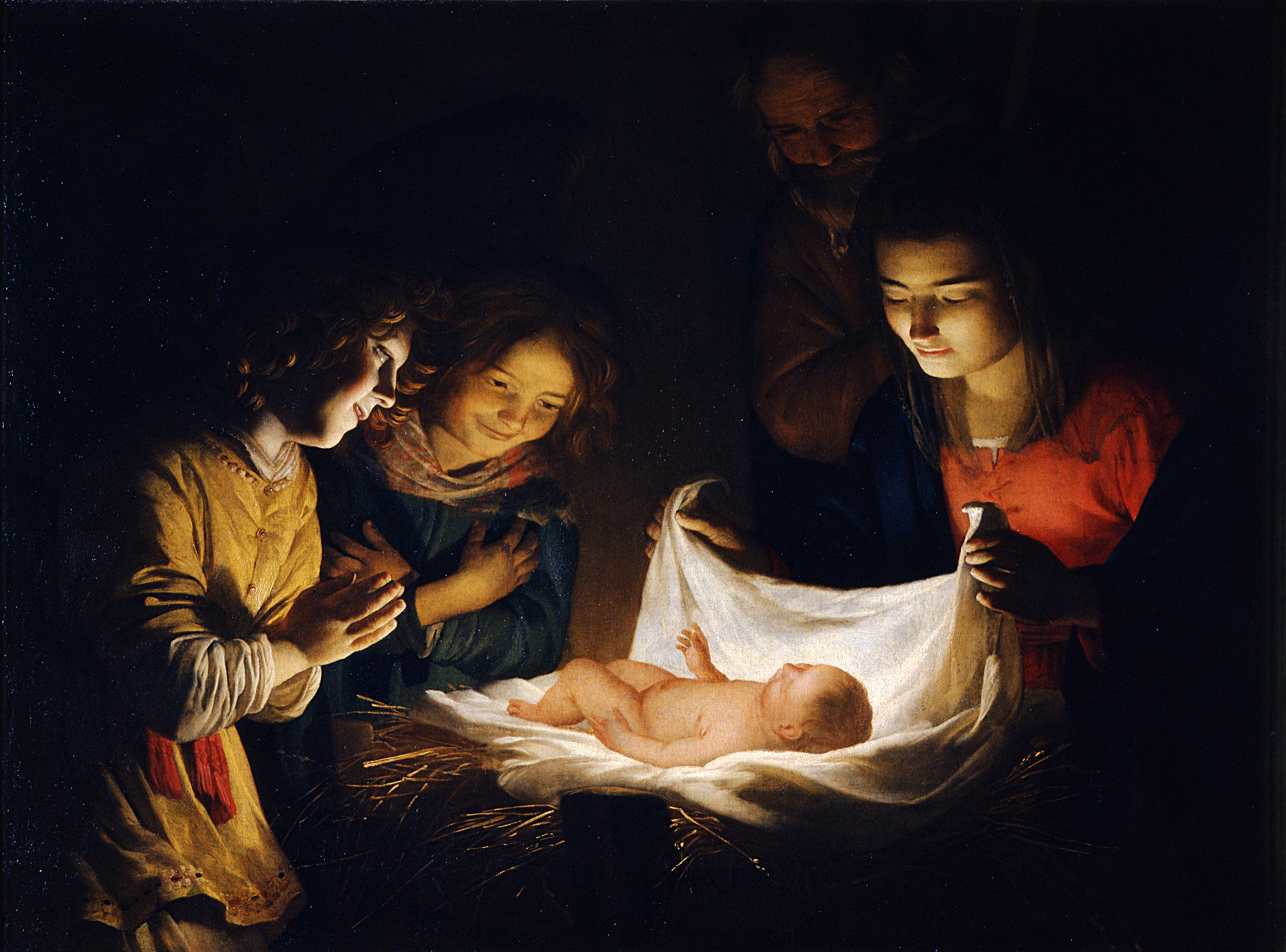
- Artist: Gerard van Honthorst
- Year: 1619–1621
- Medium: oil paint, canvas
- Dimensions: 95.5 cm (37.6 in) × 131 cm (52 in)
- Location: Uffizi

Adoration of the Christ Child (Italian: Adorazione del Bambino), is a c. 1619–1621 oil on canvas painting of the Nativity by the Dutch Golden Age artist Gerard Honthorst in the collection of the Uffizi in Florence.

== Painting ==
The Adoration of the Child shows a moonlit scene with Mary laying the Child in swaddling clothes. Joseph is looking over her shoulder and two angels are leaning over the crib. The moonlight is reflected off the faces in such a way that suggests the Child as a light source. The composition is reminiscent of much earlier versions, such as the 1490 Nativity at Night by Geertgen tot Sint Jans. The "Child as light source" aspect was used again and further exaggerated by Honthorst the next year when he painted the same subject, today held by the Wallraf-Richartz Museum.

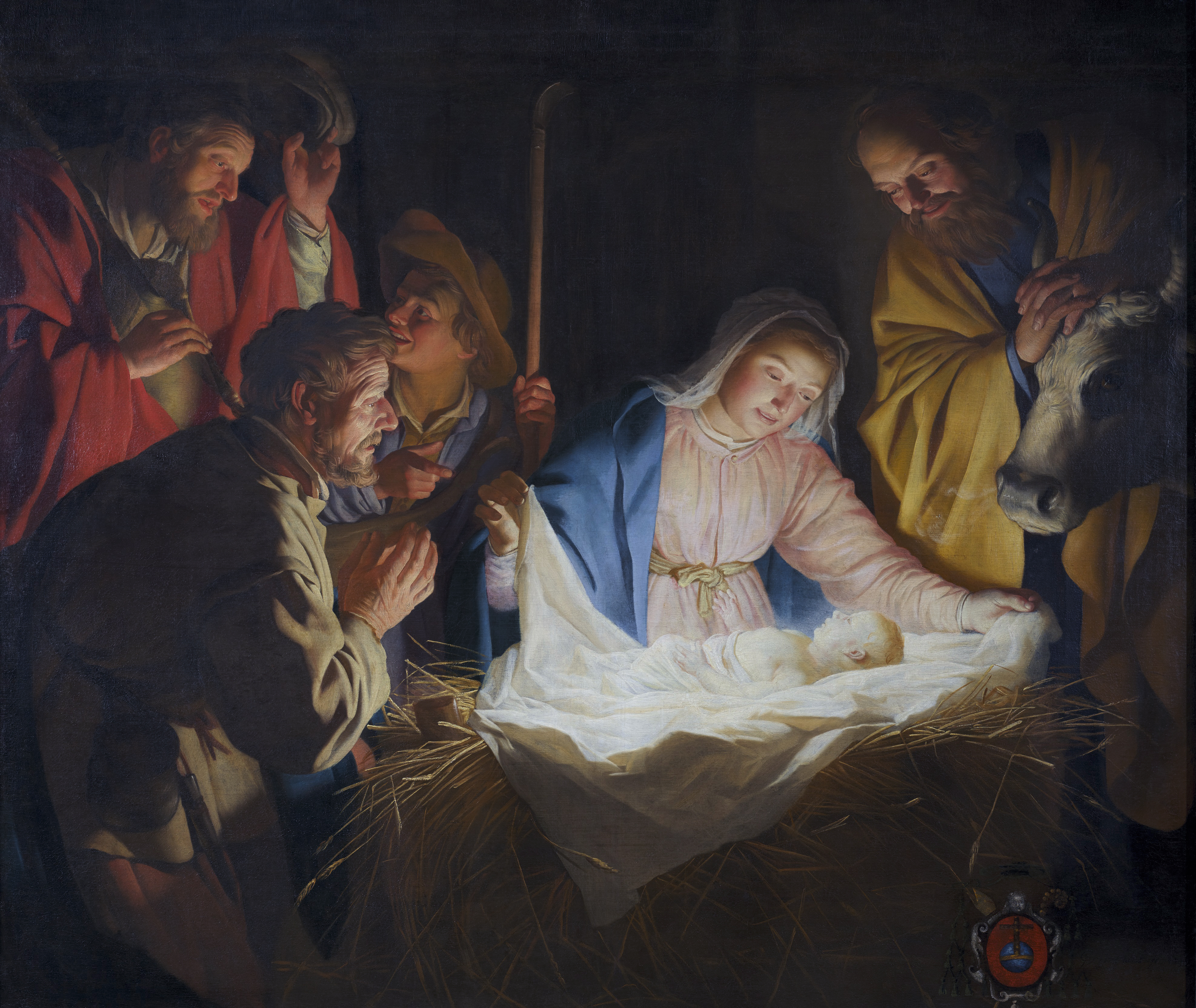
Adoration of the Shepherds, 1622, Wallraf-Richartz Museum

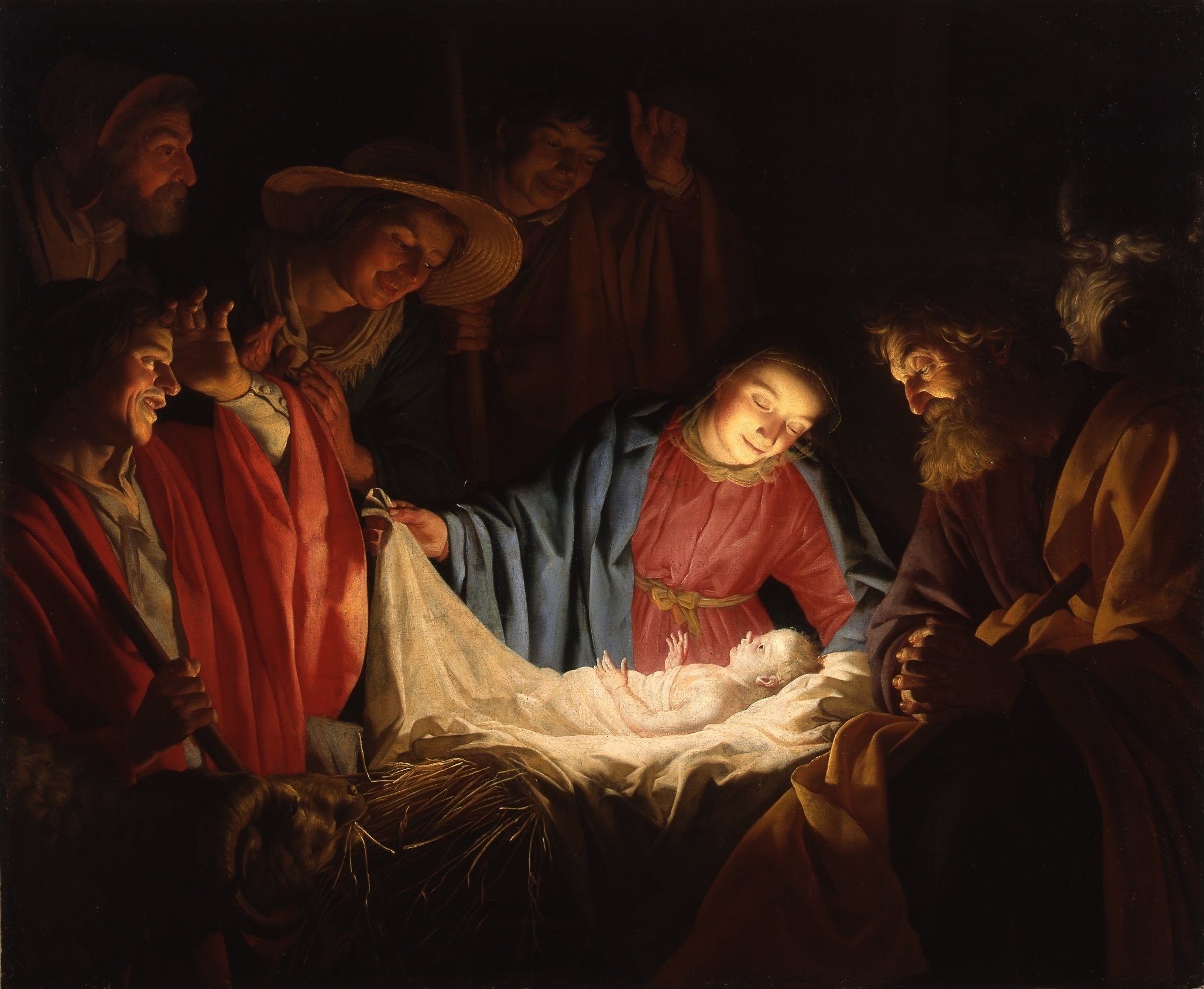
Adoration of the Shepherds, c. 1622, Pomerania State Museum

== Provenance ==
This painting is one of five paintings by Honthorst in the Uffizi, and all of them feature a tenebrist style that shows why the Italians call him Gherardo delle Notti or "Gerard of the Night". Presumably these were all purchased in 1628 by Ferdinando II de' Medici, Grand Duke of Tuscany, who had just returned from a trip to Northern Europe and sent an intermediary to inquire after "6 paintings" that were for sale in Rome.
