= Christ Before the High Priest =

1617 painting by Gerard van Honthorst

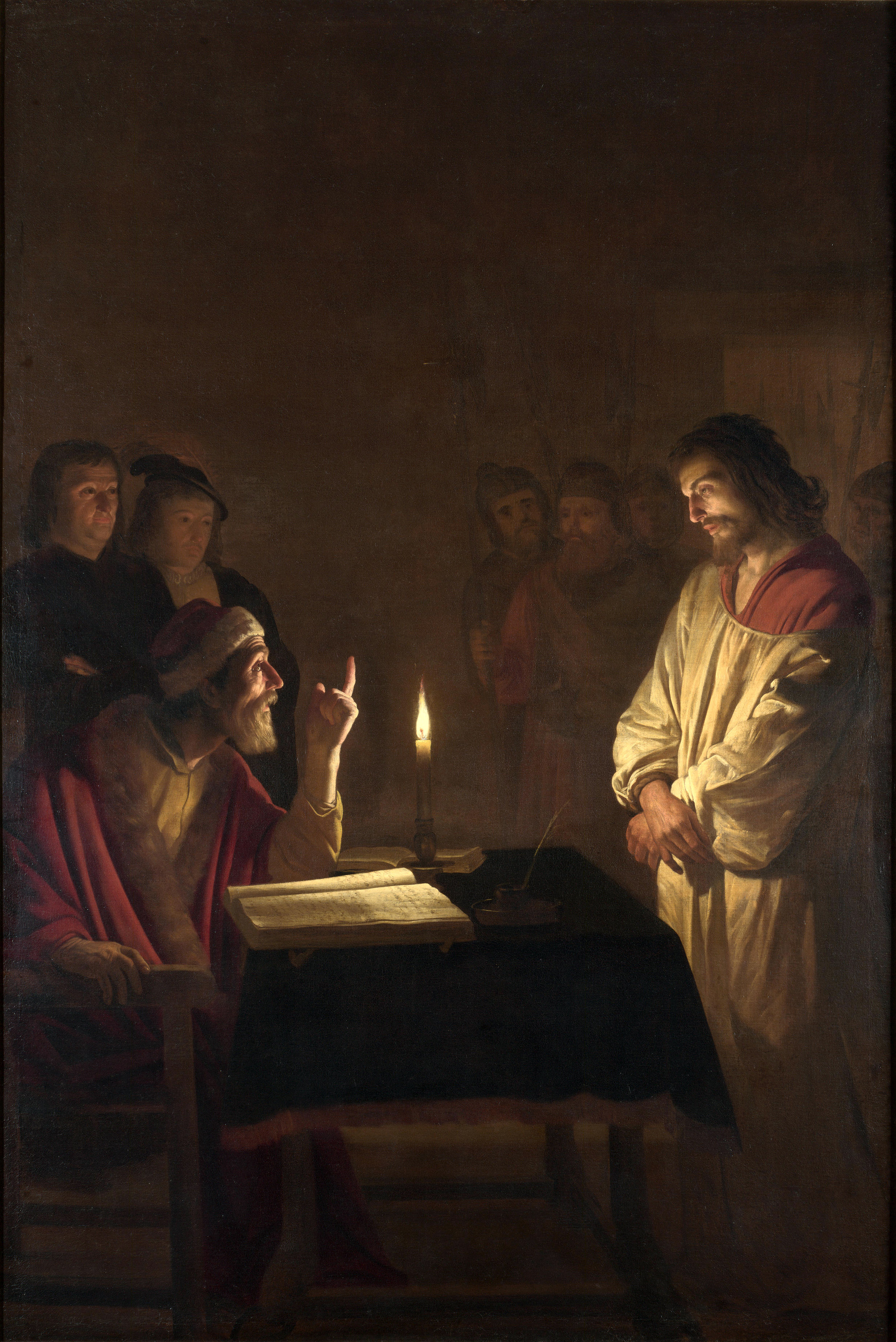
- Artist: Gerard van Honthorst
- Year: c. 1617
- Medium: oil on canvas
- Dimensions: 272 cm × 183 cm (107 in × 72 in)
- Location: National Gallery, London

Christ Before the High Priest is an oil on canvas painting by Dutch artist Gerard van Honthorst, created around 1617. It now hangs in London's National Gallery. It depicts Jesus Christ being questioned by the High Priest Caiaphas shortly before being sentenced to death.

== History ==
From 1610 to 1620 Gerard van Honthorst stayed and worked in Rome. During this time the Marquis Vincenzo Giustiniani commissioned this painting from Honthorst for his palace's collection.

Honthorst may have been influenced in his composition by the works of the painter Luca Cambiaso – whose art was also in Giustiniani's collection – as well as the Italian master Caravaggio.

Christ before the High Priest would go on to have multiple owners:

1. Vincenzo Giustiniani's collection, Rome, 1638–1804
2. Lucien Bonaparte's collection, Paris, 1804–1820
3. Duke of Lucca's collection, 1820–1840
4. 4th Duke of Sutherland's collection, Great Britain, 1840–1913
5. The National Gallery, London, 1922

== Description ==
The painting depicts a scene from the canonical gospels concerning the Passion of Jesus, specifically Jesus's questioning by the Jewish religious authorities.

The gospels describe how, after his initial capture, Jesus was brought before Caiaphas – a high priest in the Jewish Sanhedrin. Honthorst depicts the moment that Caiaphas asks Jesus if he truly claims to be God.

The scene takes place at night. Jesus and Caiaphas are separated by a table upon which a candle provides the only light. These furnishings have been added to the Gospel scene by Honthorst and serve to divide Jesus from Caiaphas physically, just as the two were spiritually divided by Jesus's claim to be the divine in human form.

Caiaphas is seated behind the table with a book of Mosaic law and points his finger accusingly at Jesus. However, Jesus looks down on Caiaphas with serenity, seemingly unconcerned. His face and body language express the peace and self-control that, according to Gospel testimony, he maintained throughout the interrogation process.

Jesus and Caiaphas are clothed in similar colours – red and white. However, red is more prominent on Caiaphas, whereas Jesus is adorned almost completely in white. This may be an allusion to the figurative language often used in Christianity, where white often represents sinless purity and red blood or sacrifice.

In the background, behind Christ and Caiaphas, are the figures of other high priests. They await judgment and their faces are shrouded in darkness.
