= Gerard van Honthorst =

Dutch painter (1592–1656)

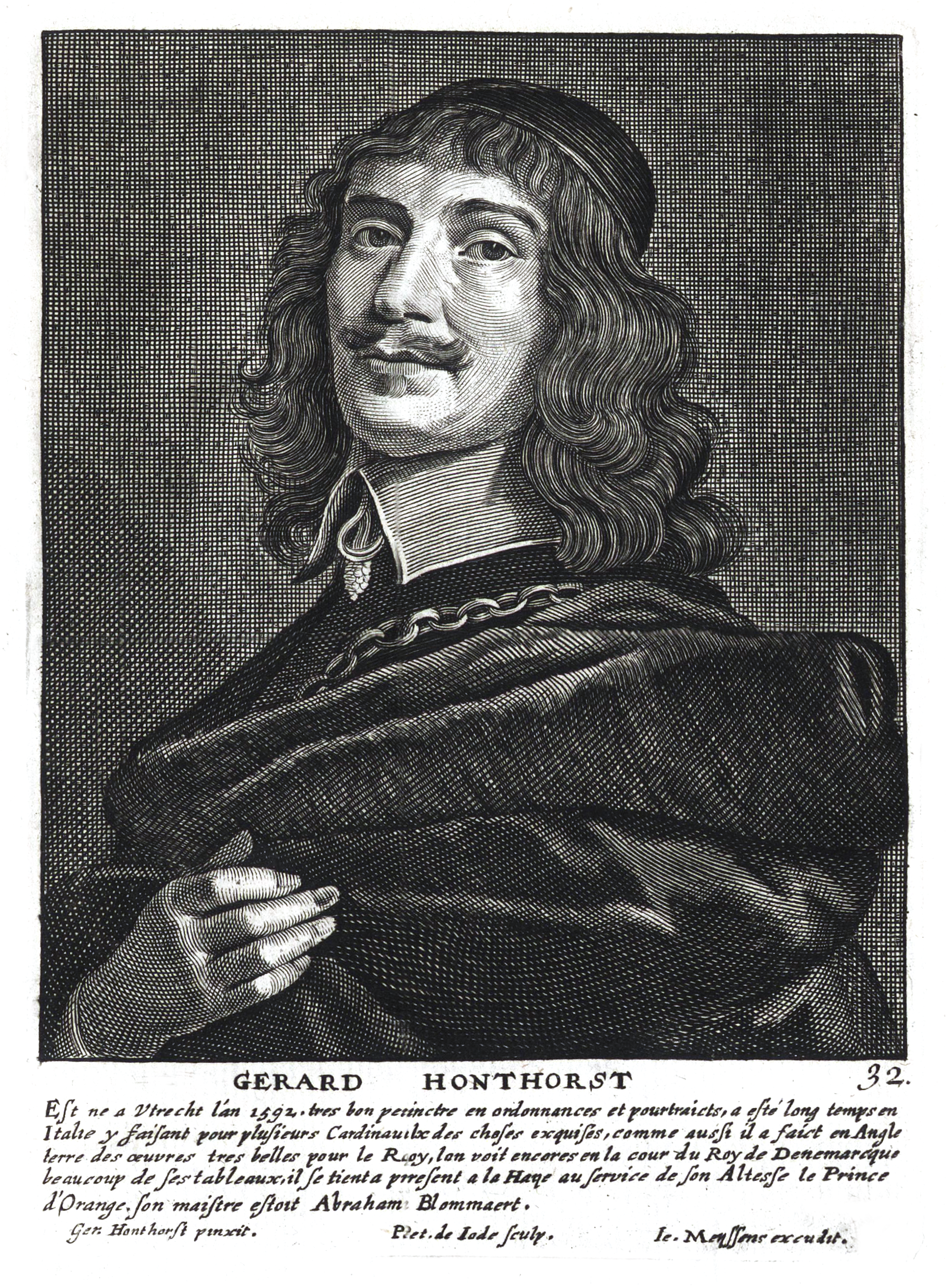
- Portrait in Het Gulden Cabinet, 1662
- Born: 4 November 1592; Utrecht, Dutch Republic
- Died: 27 April 1656 (aged 63); Utrecht, Dutch Republic
- Education: Abraham Bloemaert
- Known for: Painting
- Notable work: The Matchmaker
- Movement: Utrecht Caravaggism; Classicism
- Patrons: Vincenzo Giustiniani

Gerard "Gerrit" van Honthorst (4 November 1592 – 27 April 1656) was a Dutch Golden Age painter who became known for his depiction of artificially lit scenes, eventually receiving the Italian nickname Gherardo delle Notti ("Gerard of the Nights"). Early in his career he visited Rome, where he had great success painting in a style influenced by Caravaggio. Following his return to the Netherlands he became a leading portrait painter. Van Honthorst's contemporaries included Utrecht painters Hendrick ter Brugghen and Dirck van Baburen.

== Early life ==
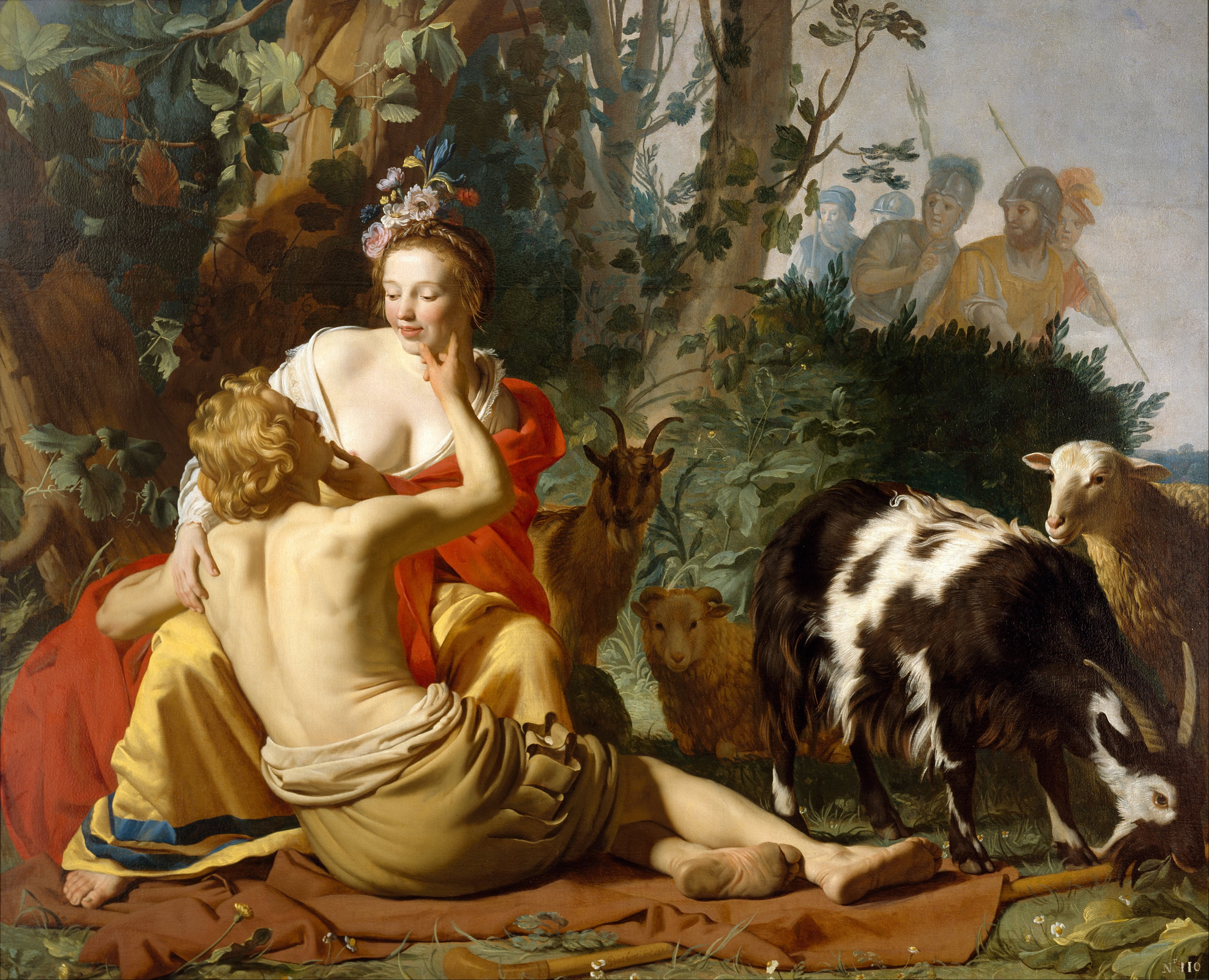
Granida and Daifilo, 1625

The Concert, 1623, National Gallery of Art (Washington, D.C.)

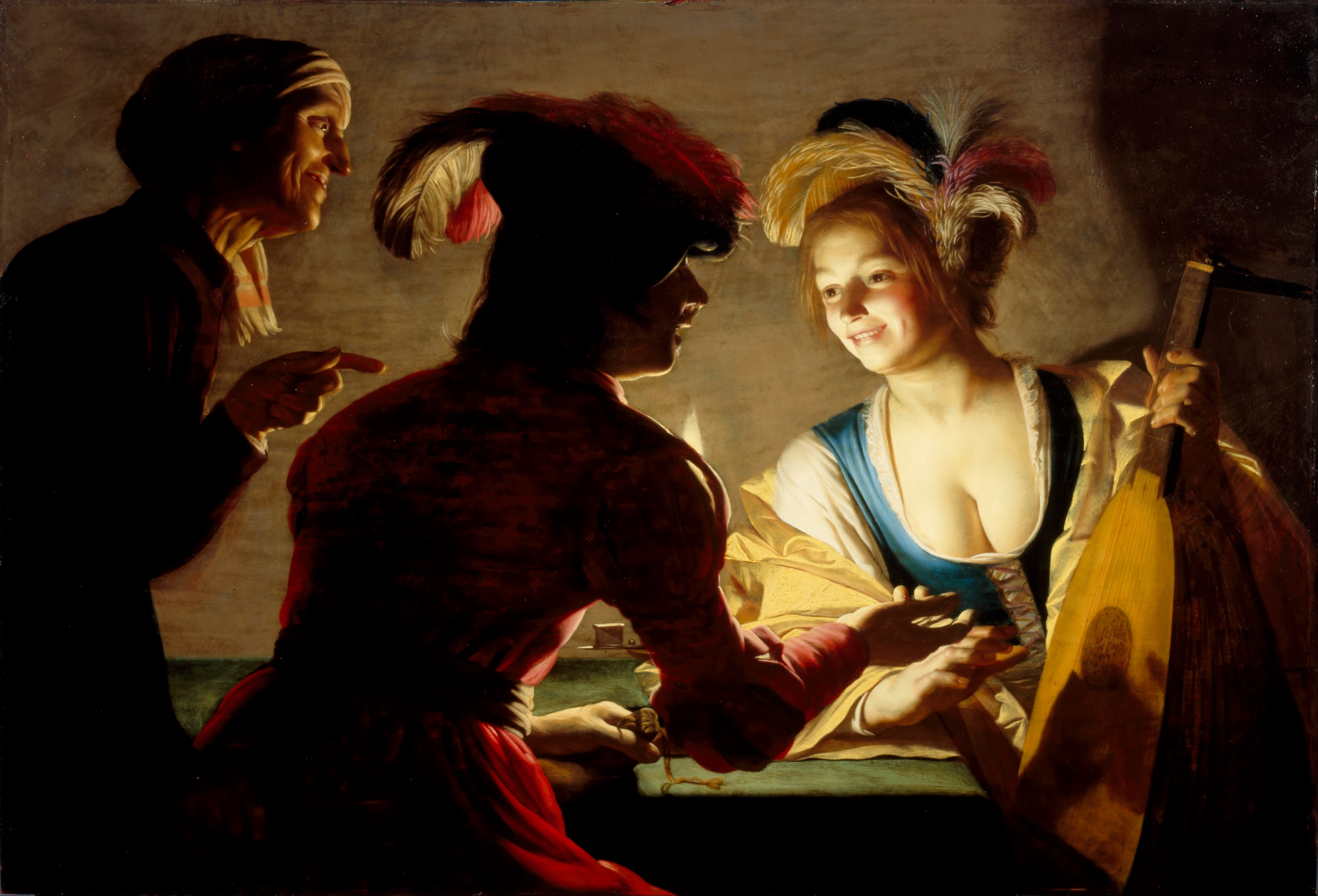
The Matchmaker (1625), showing the use of Carravagesque lighting effects

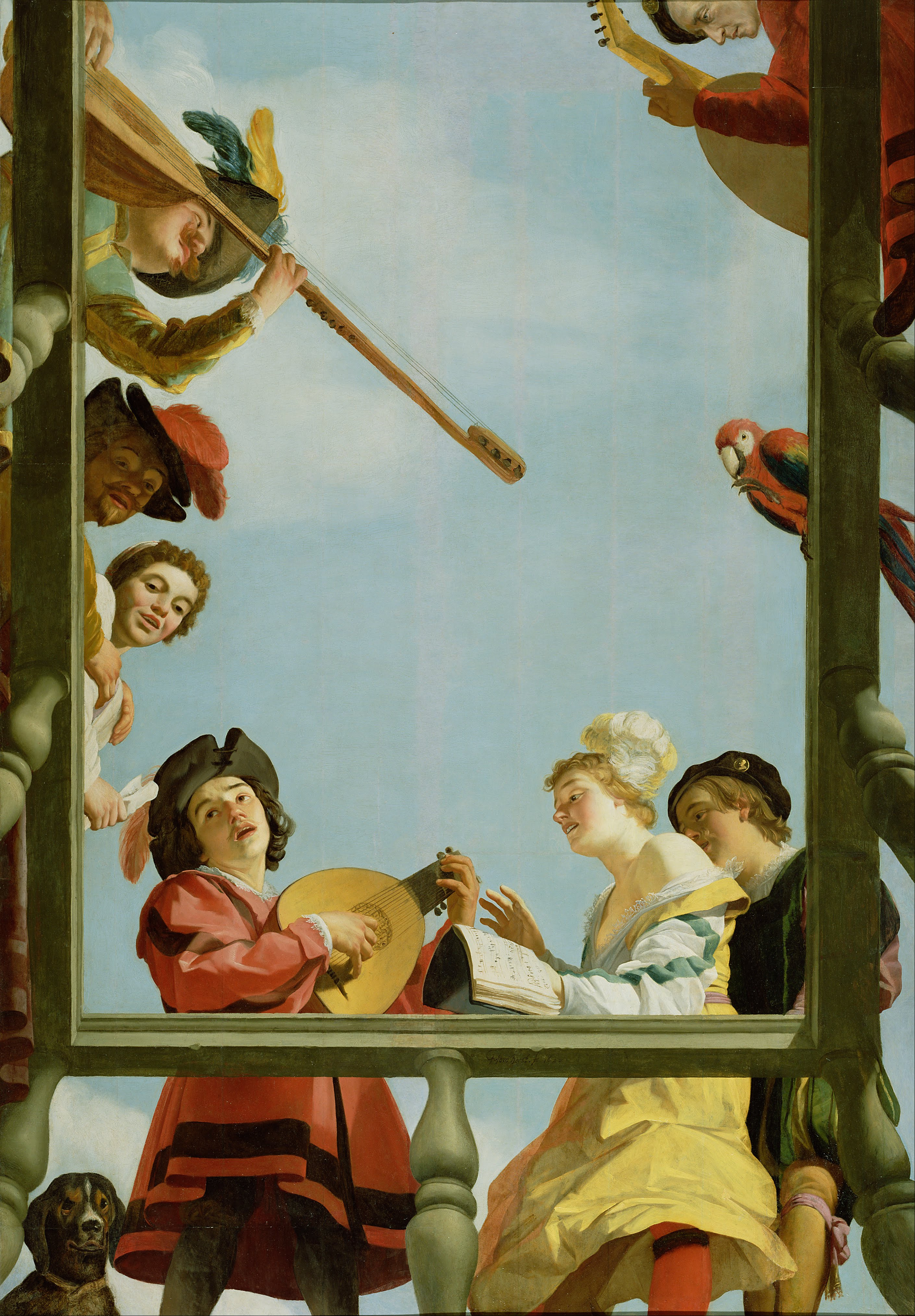
Musical Group on a Balcony (1622)

Van Honthorst was born in Utrecht, the son of a decorative painter, and trained under his father, and then under Abraham Bloemaert.

== Italy ==
Having completed his education, Honthorst went to Italy, where he is first recorded in 1616. He was one of the artists from Utrecht who went to Rome at around this time, all of whom were to be deeply influenced by the recent art they encountered there. They were named the Utrecht caravaggisti. The other three were Dirk van Baburen, Hendrick ter Bruggen and Jan van Bijlert. In Rome he lodged at the palace of Vincenzo Giustiniani, where he painted Christ Before the High Priest, now in London's National Gallery. Giustiniani had an important art collection, and Honthorst was especially influenced by the contemporary artists, including Caravaggio, Bartolomeo Manfredi and the Carracci. He was particularly known for his depiction of artificially lit scenes. Cardinal Scipione Borghese became another important patron, securing important commissions for him at San Silvestro Della Mariro, Montecompatri, and at Santa Maria della Vittoria, Rome. He also worked for Cosimo II de' Medici, Grand Duke of Tuscany.

== Return to Utrecht ==
Honthorst returned to Utrecht in 1620, and went on to build a considerable reputation both in the Dutch Republic and abroad. In 1623, the year of his marriage, he was president of the Guild of St. Luke in Utrecht. He soon became so fashionable that Sir Dudley Carleton, then English envoy at The Hague, recommended his works to Thomas Howard, 21st Earl of Arundel. In 1626 Honthorst hosted a dinner for Peter Paul Rubens, and painted him as the honest man sought for and found by Diogenes.

== Royal patronage ==
Queen Elizabeth of Bohemia, sister of Charles I of England and Electress Palatine, then in exile in the Netherlands, commissioned Honthorst as a painter and employed him as a drawing-master for her children. Through her he became known to Charles, who invited him to England in 1628. There he painted several portraits, and a vast allegory, now at Hampton Court Palace, of Charles and his queen Henrietta Maria as Diana and Apollo in the clouds receiving the Duke of Buckingham as Mercury and guardian of the King of Bohemia's children. He painted a more intimate group portrait of The Four Eldest Children of the King of Bohemia, (also at Hampton Court) in which the two eldest are depicted as Diana and Apollo.

After his return to Utrecht, Honthorst retained the patronage of the English monarch, painting for him, in 1631, a large picture of the king and queen of Bohemia and all their children. At around the same time he painted some pictures illustrating the Odyssey for Lord Dorchester, and some showing incidents of Danish history for Christian IV of Denmark. He also painted a portrait of the King's daughter Leonora Christina Ulfeldt while she was in The Hague.

His popularity in the Netherlands was such that he opened a second studio in The Hague, where he painted portraits of members of the court, and taught drawing. These large studios, where the work included making replicas of Honthorst's royal portraits, employed a large number of pupils and assistants; according to one pupil, Joachim von Sandrart, describing his experiences in the mid-1620s, Honthorst would have about 24 students at any one time, each paying 100 guilders a year for their education.

His brother Willem van Honthorst (1594–1666) was also a portrait painter. Many of Willem's paintings were previously misattributed to Gerrit due to the similarity of their signatures. Willem was a pupil of Abraham Bloemaert, and was also taught by his own elder brother. In 1646 he went to Berlin, where he became court painter to Louise-Henriette, wife of the Elector Frederick William of Brandenburg. He returned to Utrecht in 1664.

== Nickname ==
Honthorst is often referred to as "Gherardo delle notti" ("Gerrit of the Nights") by modern Italians. However, the nickname does not actually appear in any known Italian sources dating before Honthorst's death. Surviving Italian documents from before 1656 refer to the artist as either "Gherardo Fiammingo" ("Gerrit the Fleming") or "Gherardo Hollandese" ("Gerrit the Dutchman"), emphasizing his foreignness rather than his trademark skill at rendering nocturnal lighting. It was only in the 18th century that the nickname "Gherardo delle notti" came into widespread use.

== Legacy ==
Honthorst was a prolific artist. His most attractive pieces are those in which he cultivates the style of Caravaggio, often tavern scenes with musicians, gamblers and people eating. He had great skill at chiaroscuro, often painting scenes illuminated by a single candle.

Some of his pieces were portraits of the Duke of Buckingham and his family (Hampton Court), the King and Queen of Bohemia (Hanover and Combe Abbey), Marie de' Medici (Amsterdam Stadthuis), 1628, the Stadtholders and their Wives (Amsterdam and The Hague), Charles Louis and Rupert, Charles I's nephews (Louvre, St Petersburg, Combe Abbey and Willin), and Baron Craven (National Portrait Gallery, London). His early style can be seen in the Lute-player (1614) in the Louvre, the Martyrdom of St John in Santa Maria della Scala at Rome, or the Liberation of Peter in the Gemäldegalerie, Berlin.

His 1620 The Adoration of the Shepherds in the Uffizi was destroyed in the Via dei Georgofili Massacre of 1993.

Honthorst's 1623 The Concert was purchased for an undisclosed sum by the National Gallery of Art in Washington, D.C., from a private collection in France in November 2013. The painting had not been on view since 1795. The 1.23-by-2.06-metre (4.0 by 6.8 ft) The Concert went on display for the first time in 218 years in a special installation at the National Gallery of Art's West Building on 23 November 2013. It remained there for six months before going on permanent display in the museum's Dutch and Flemish galleries.

== Gallery ==
Gerard van Honthorst's religious paintings

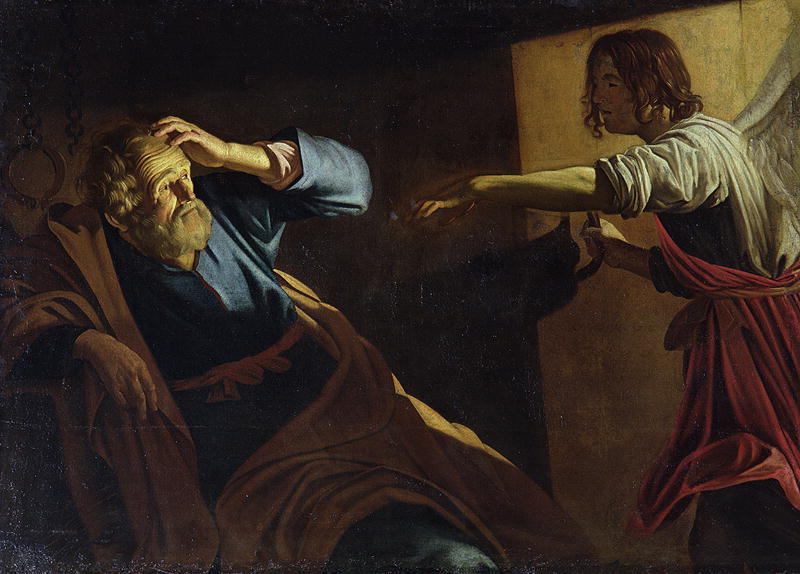
St. Peter Being Freed from Prison, 1616–1618, Berlin State Museums

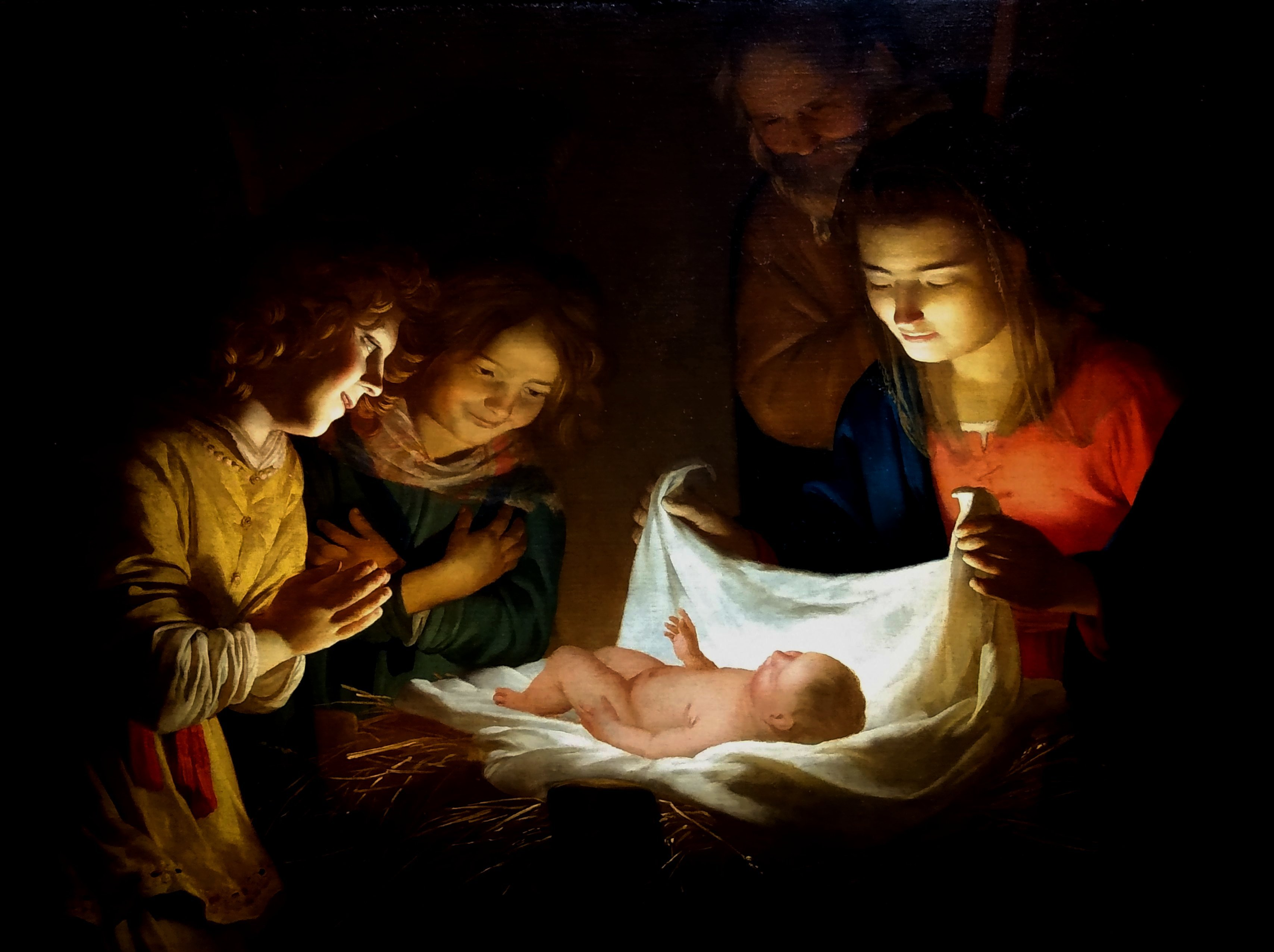
Adoration of the Child, 1620

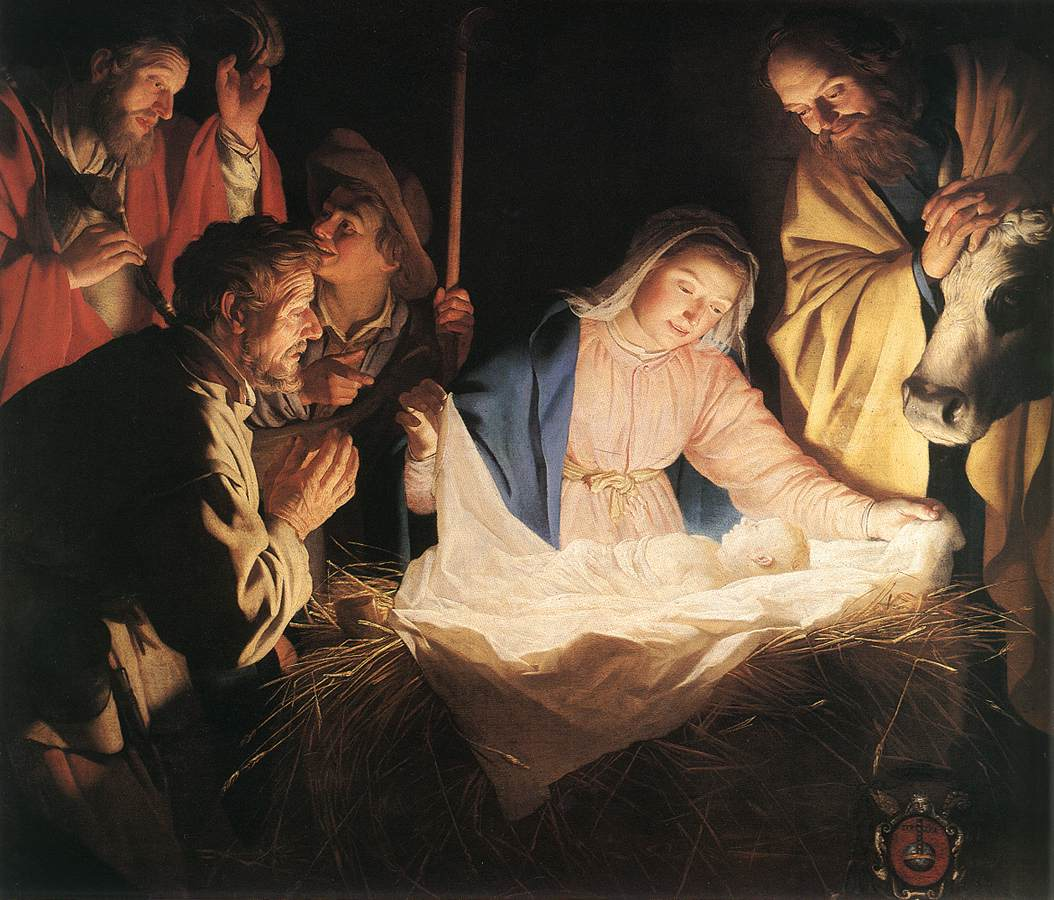
Adoration of the Shepherds 1622, Wallraf-Richartz-Museum

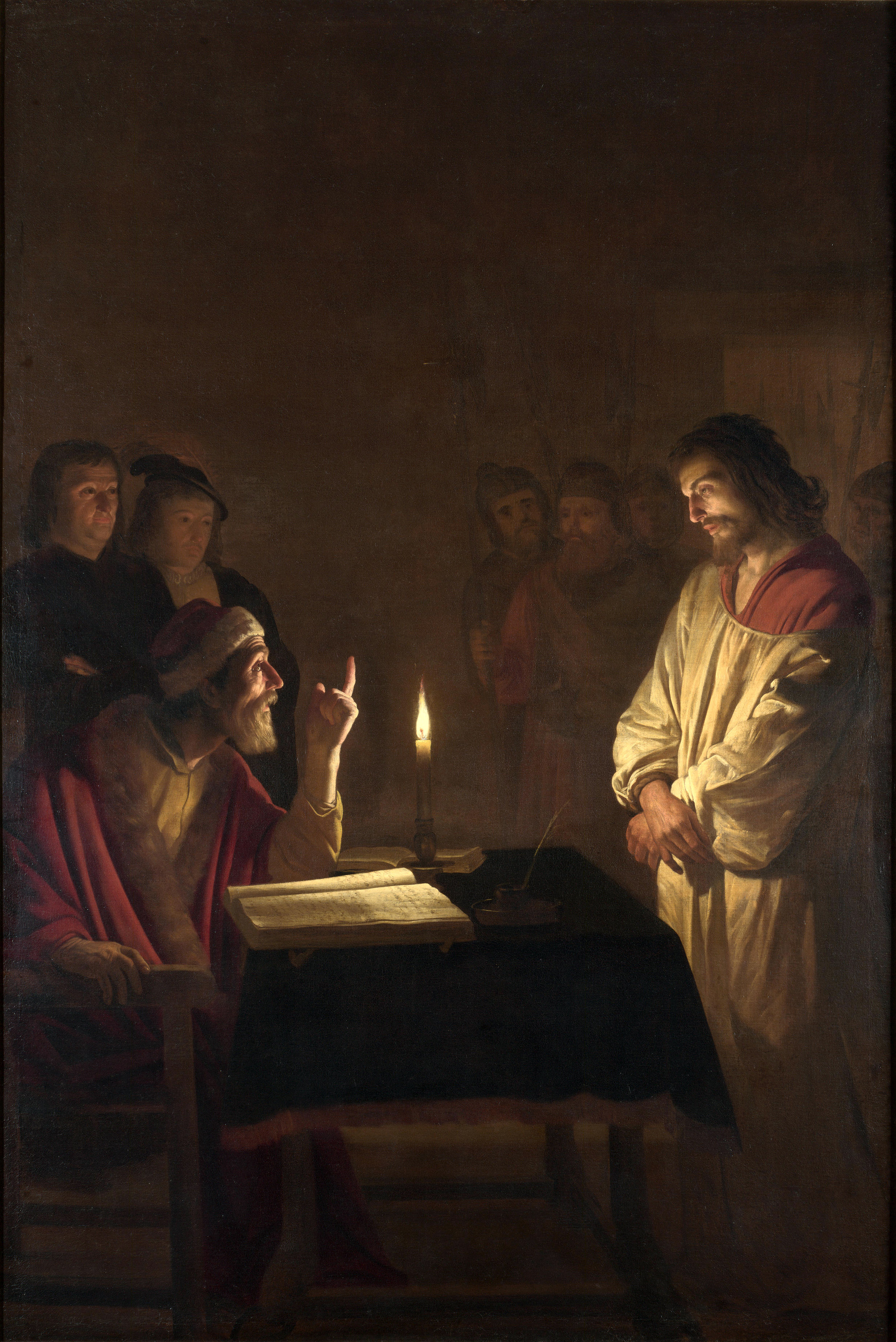
Christ before the High Priest, c. 1617, National Gallery, London

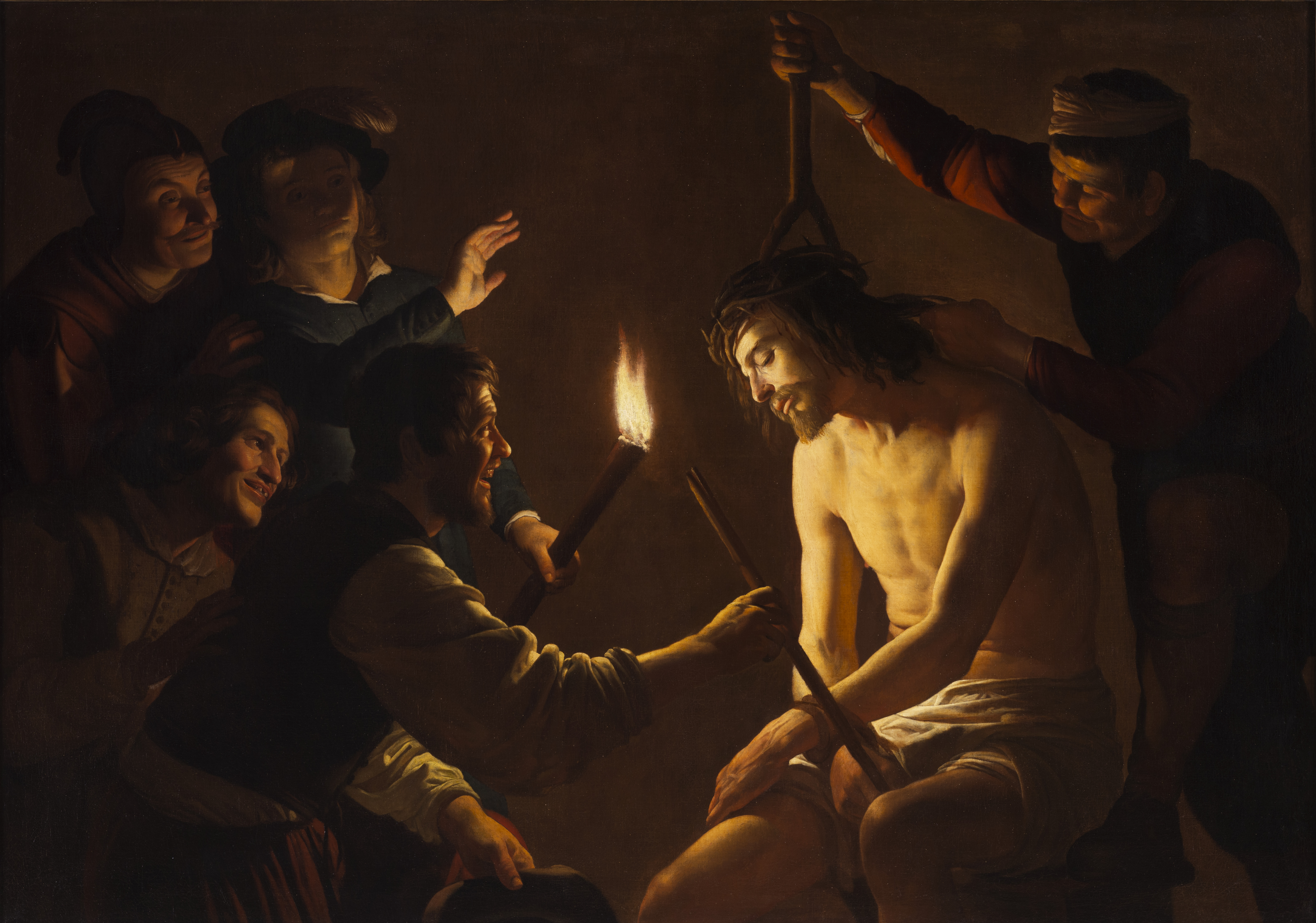
Mocking of Christ by Gerard van Honthorst

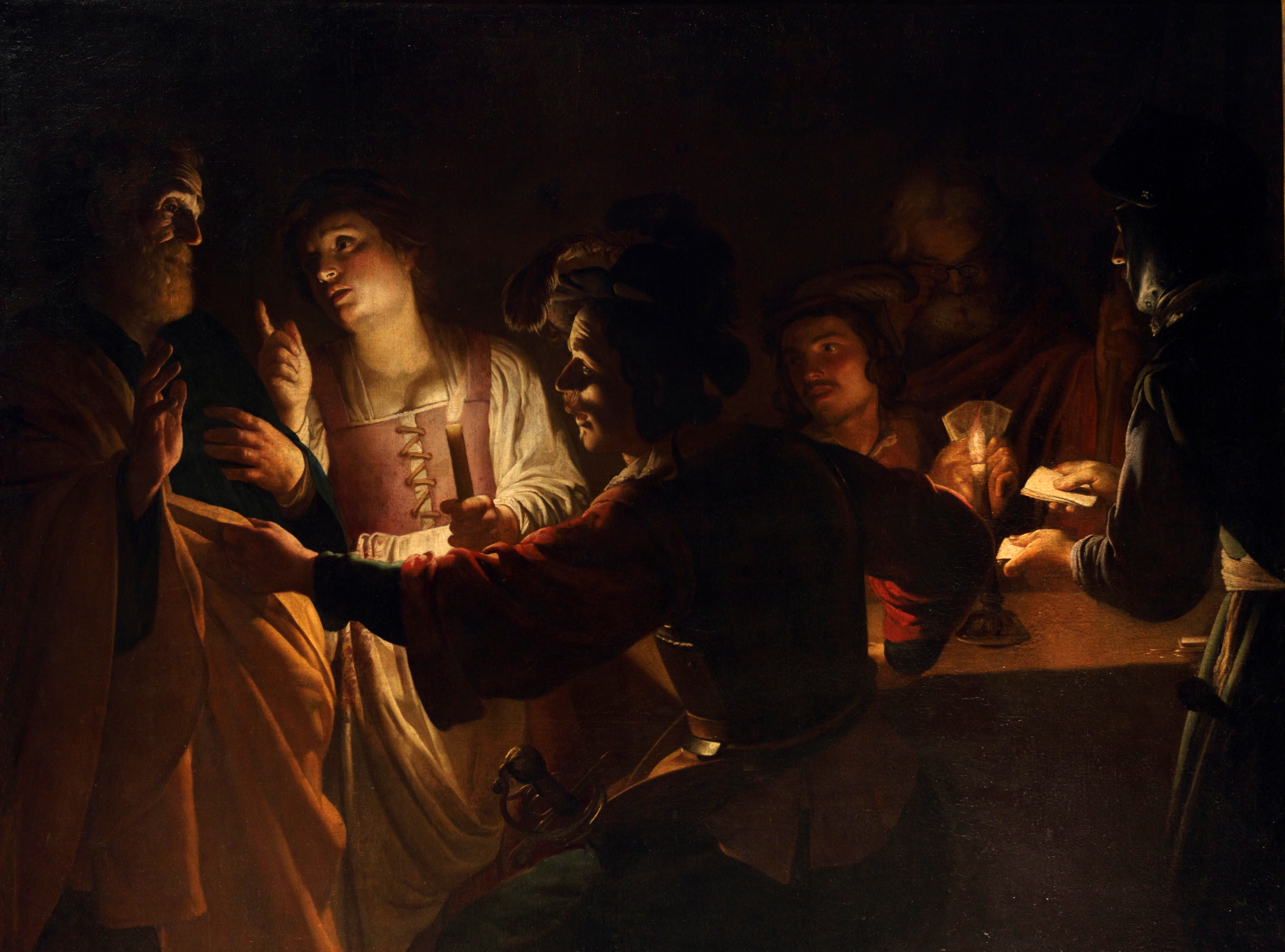
The Denial of Saint Peter, c. 1620
Gerard van Honthorst's paintings of musicians

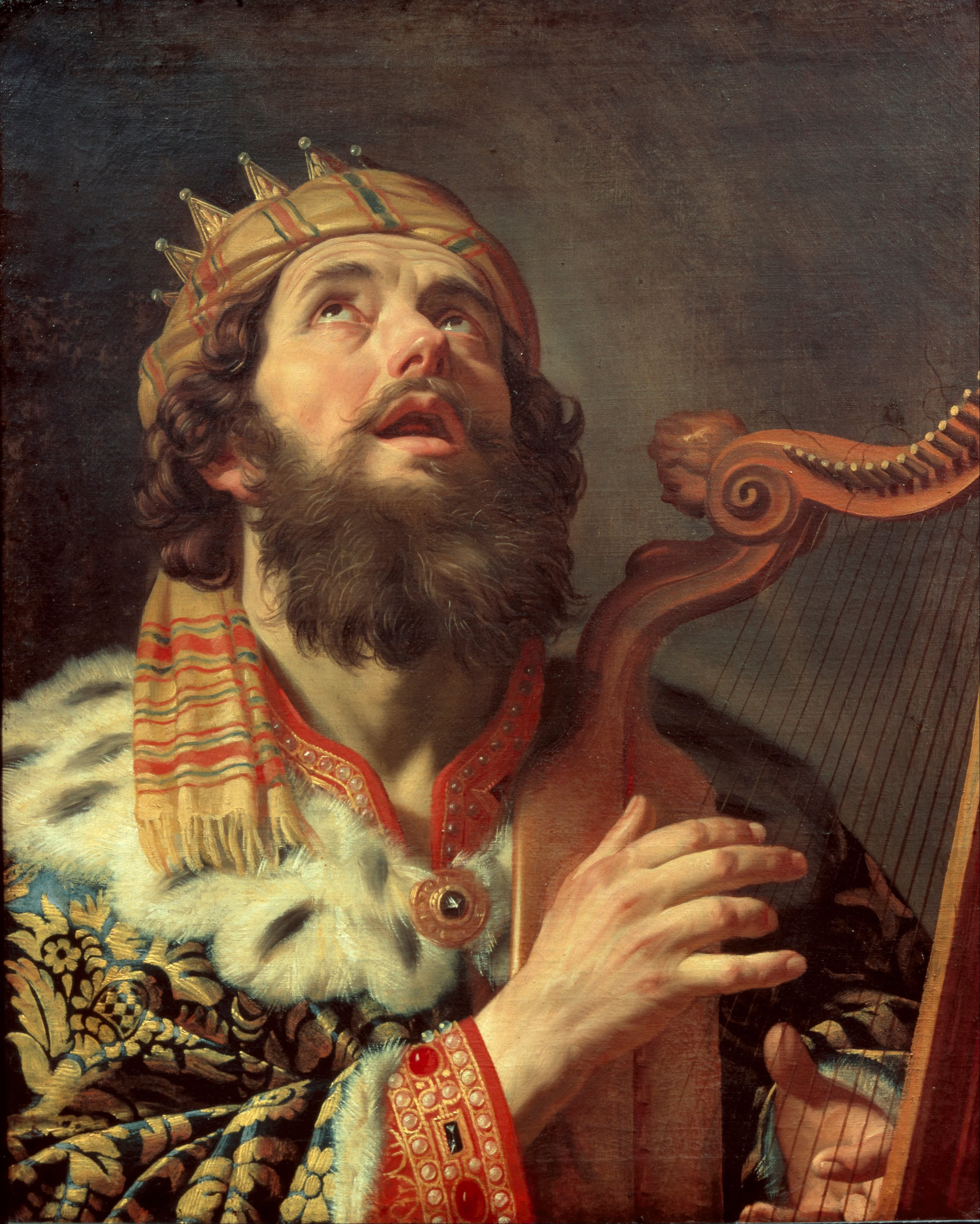
King David Playing the Harp

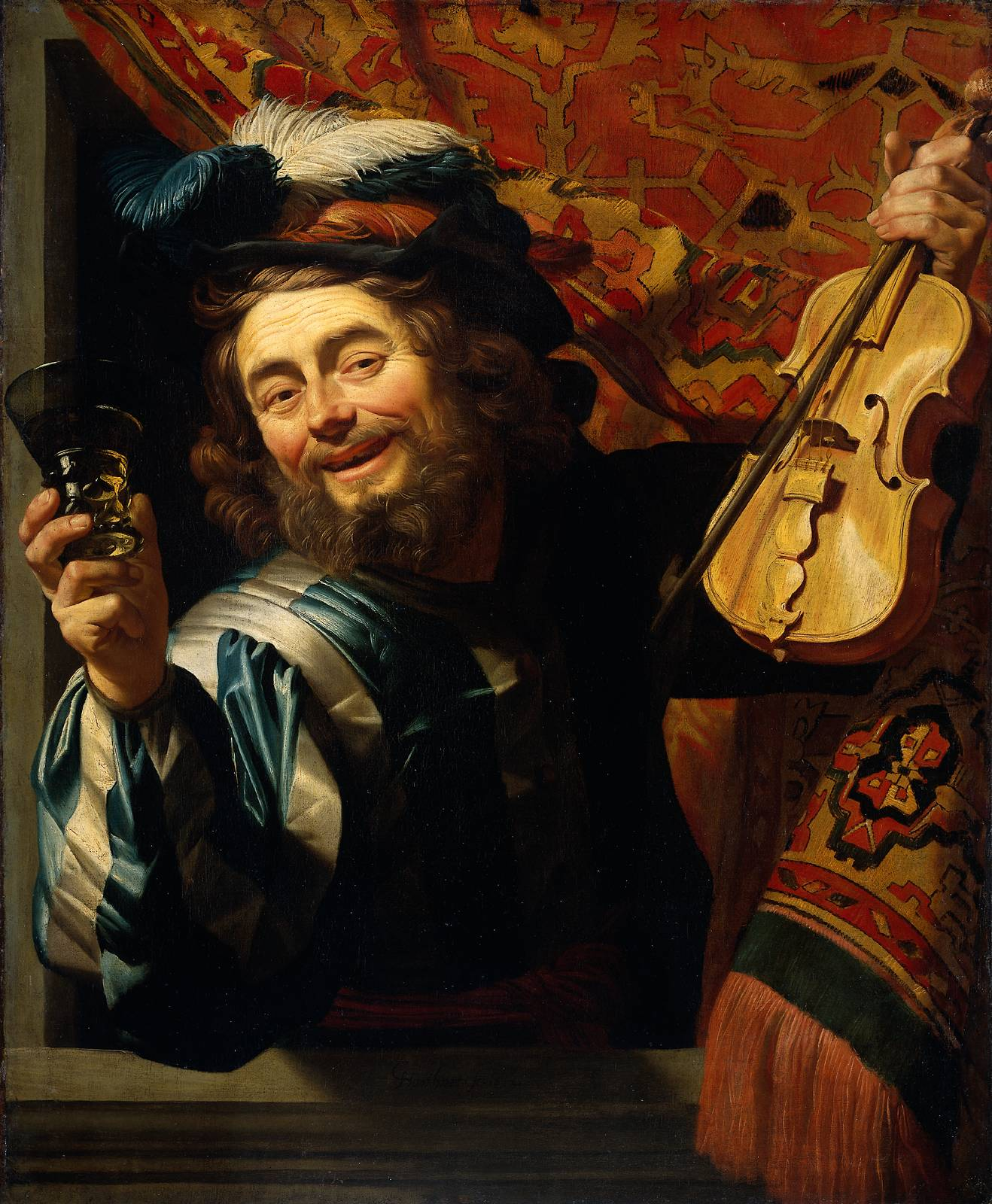
The Happy Fiddler, 1623 Rijksmuseum Amsterdam

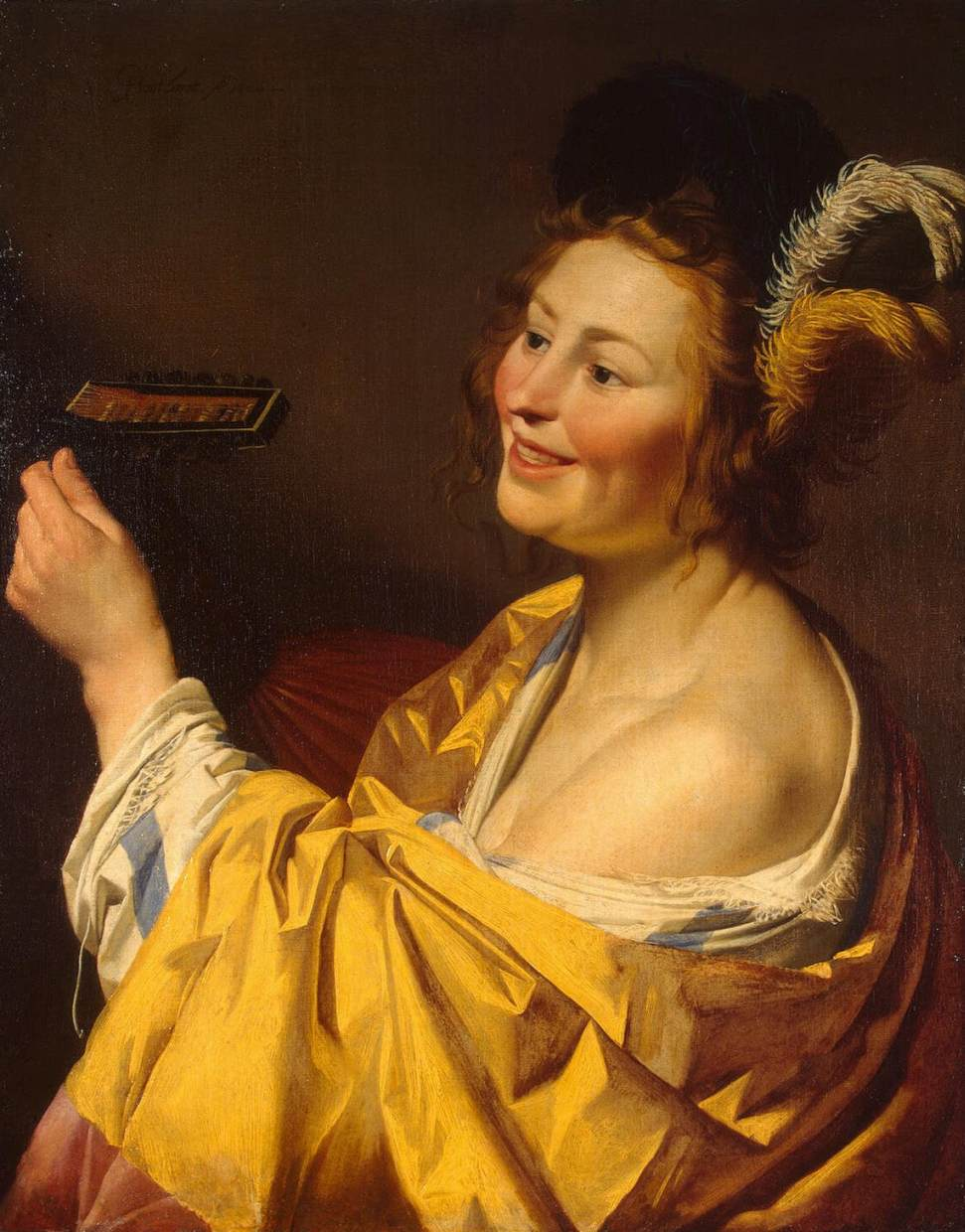
Lute Player, 1624

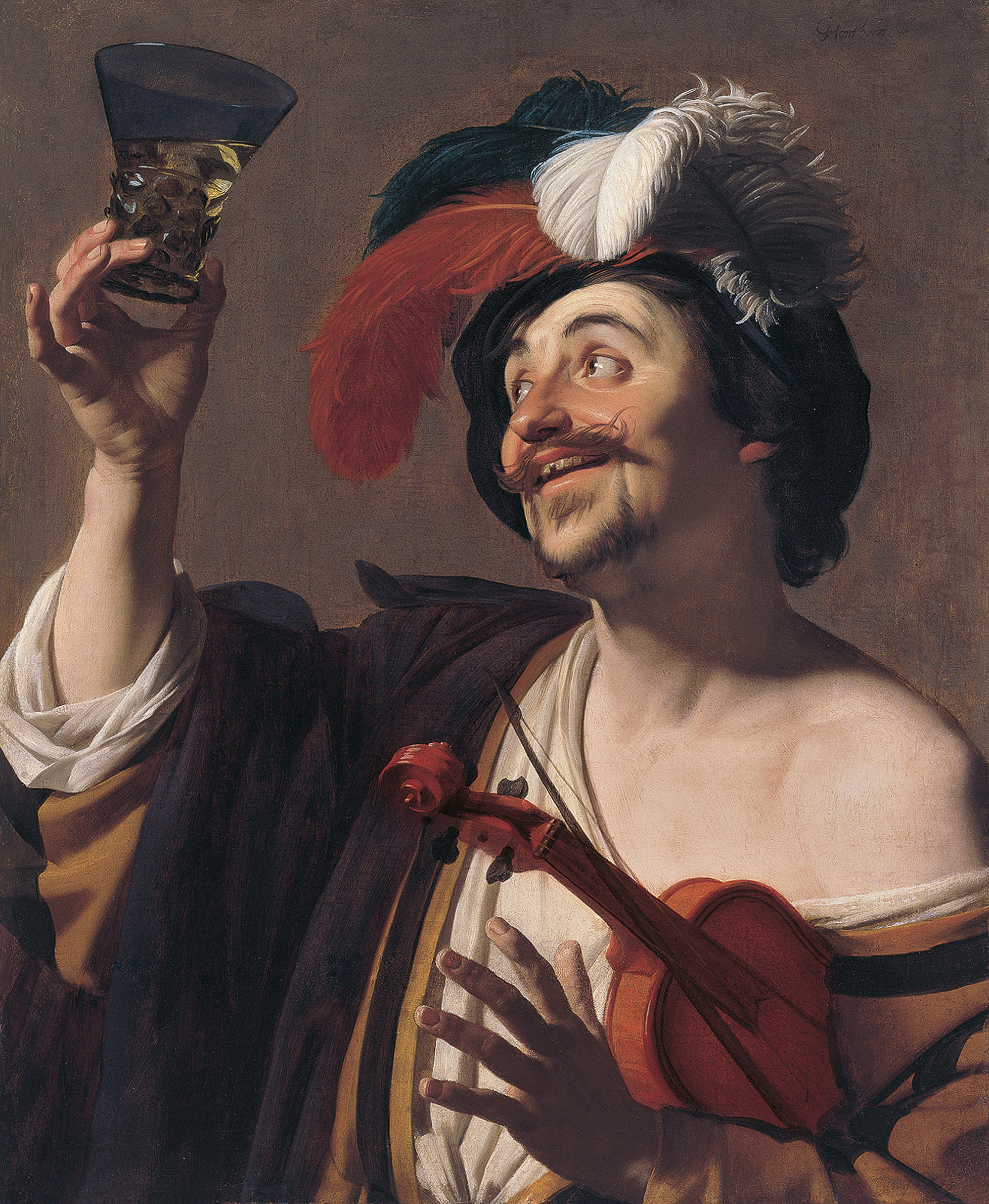
The Happy Violinist with a Glass of Wine, 1624, Thyssen-Bornemisza Museum

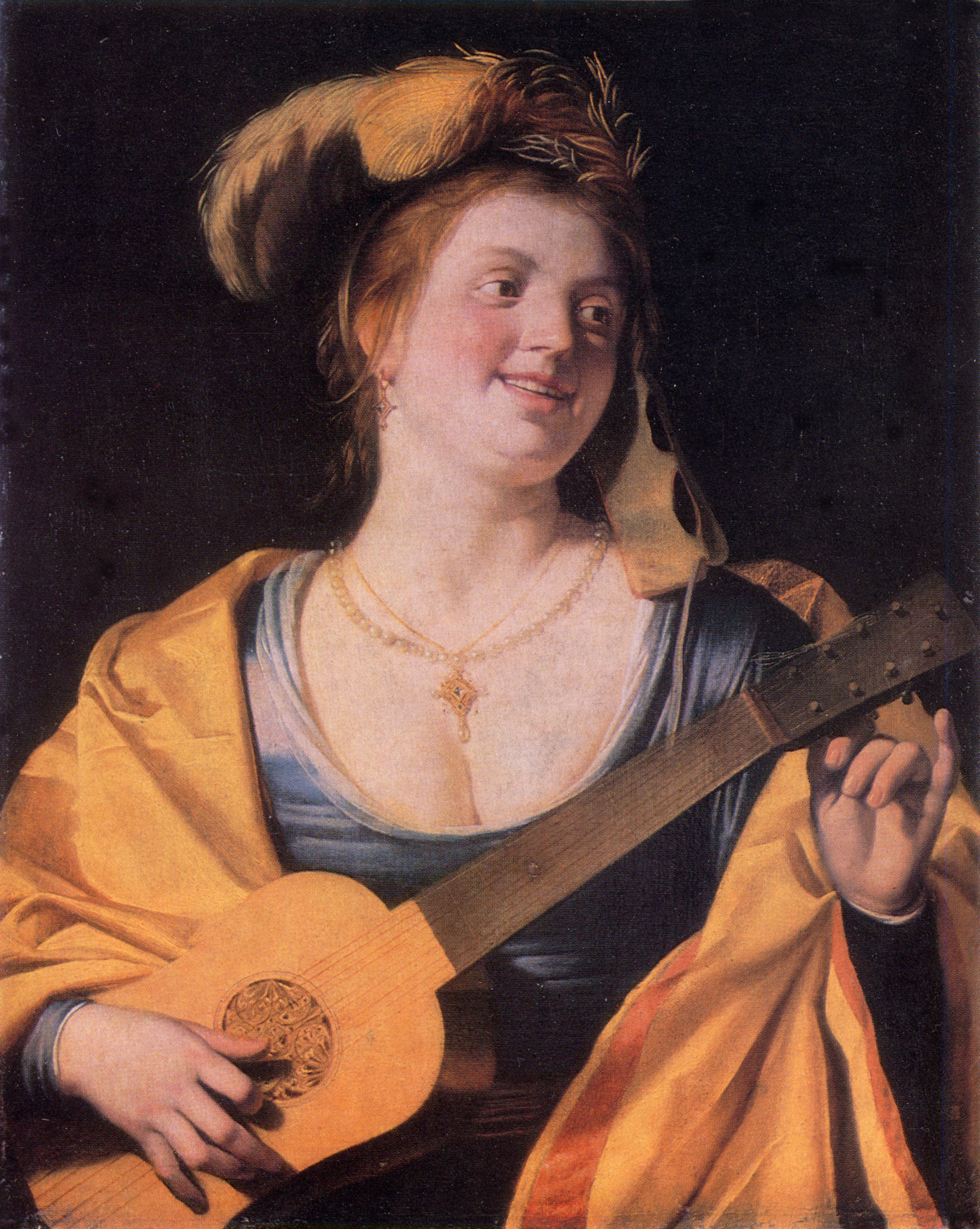
Woman with guitar 1631, Lviv National Art Gallery

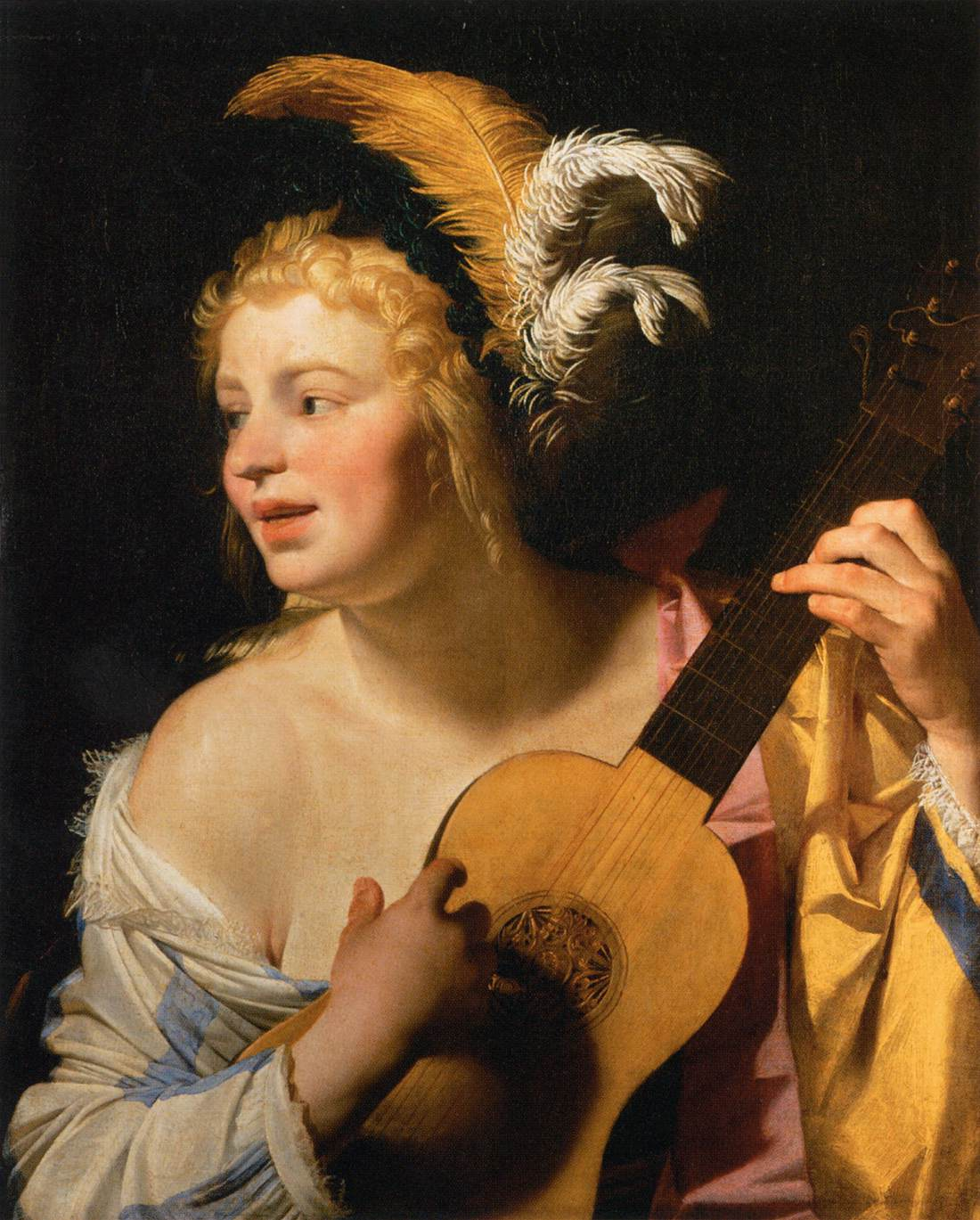
Woman Playing the Guitar

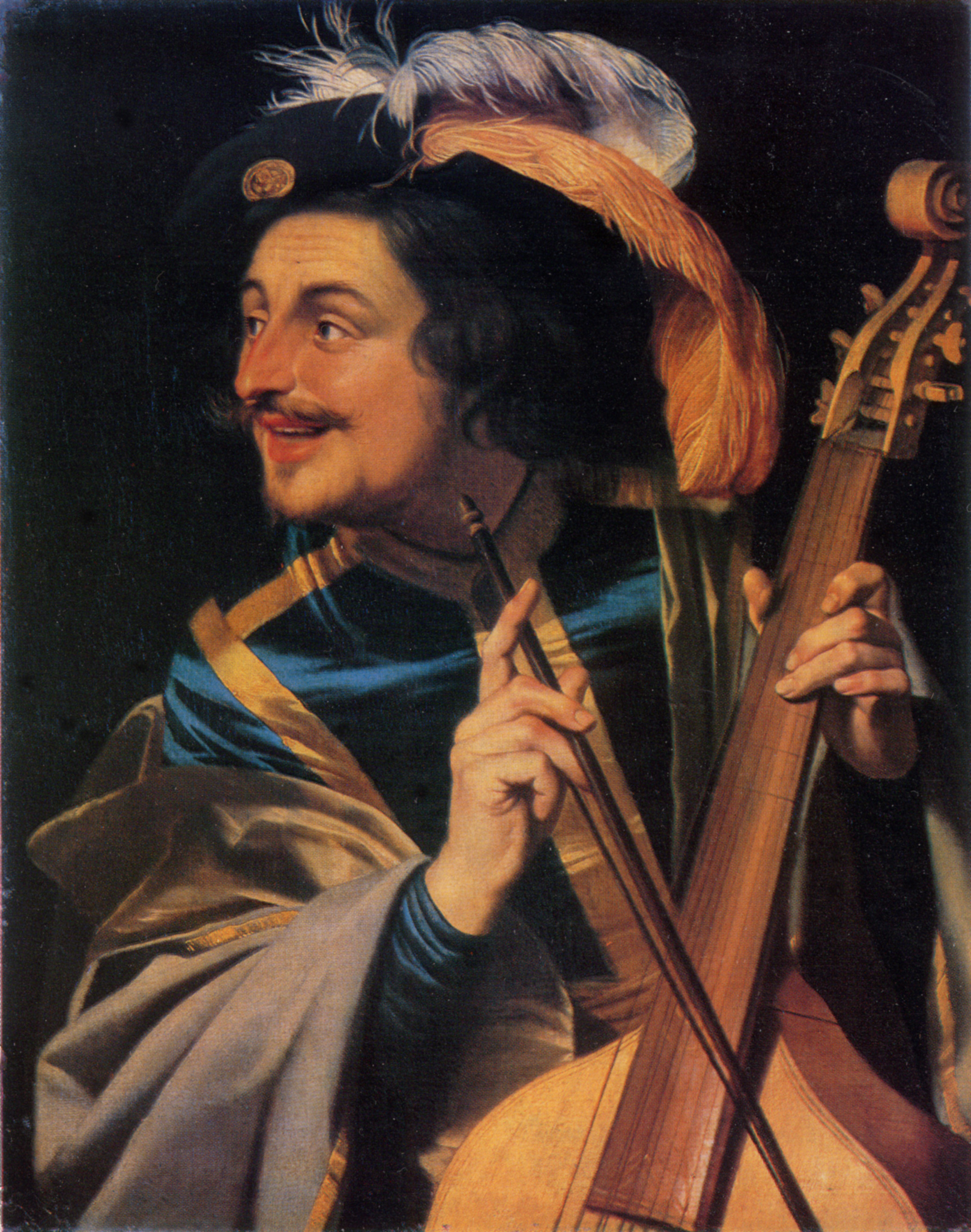
Man with viola da gamba

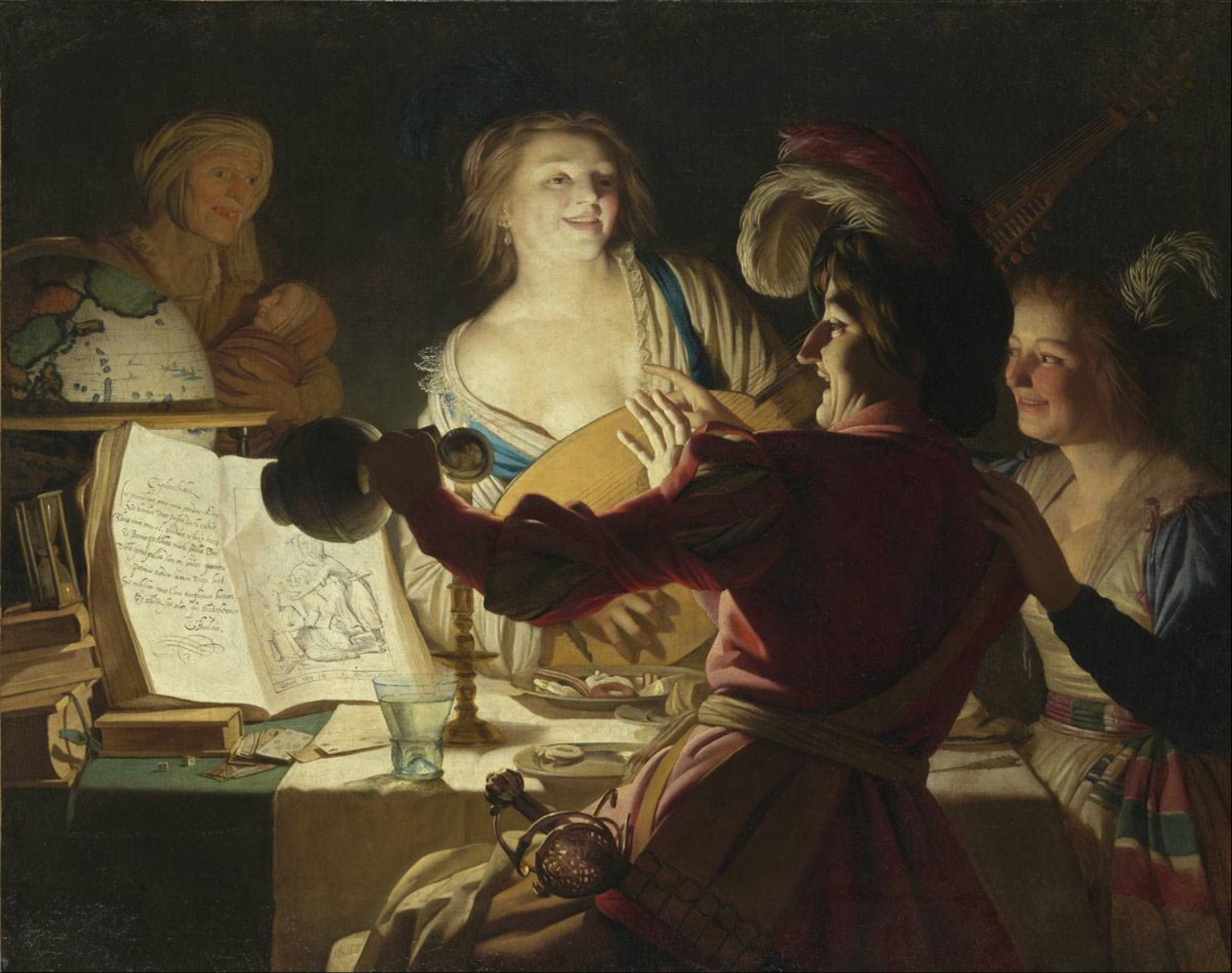
Merry Company

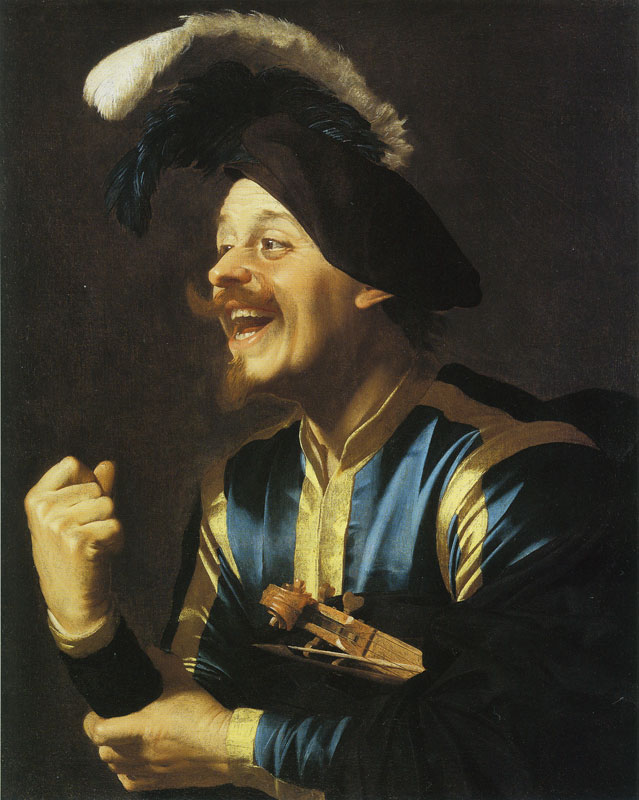
Merry Musician with Violin under His Left Arm

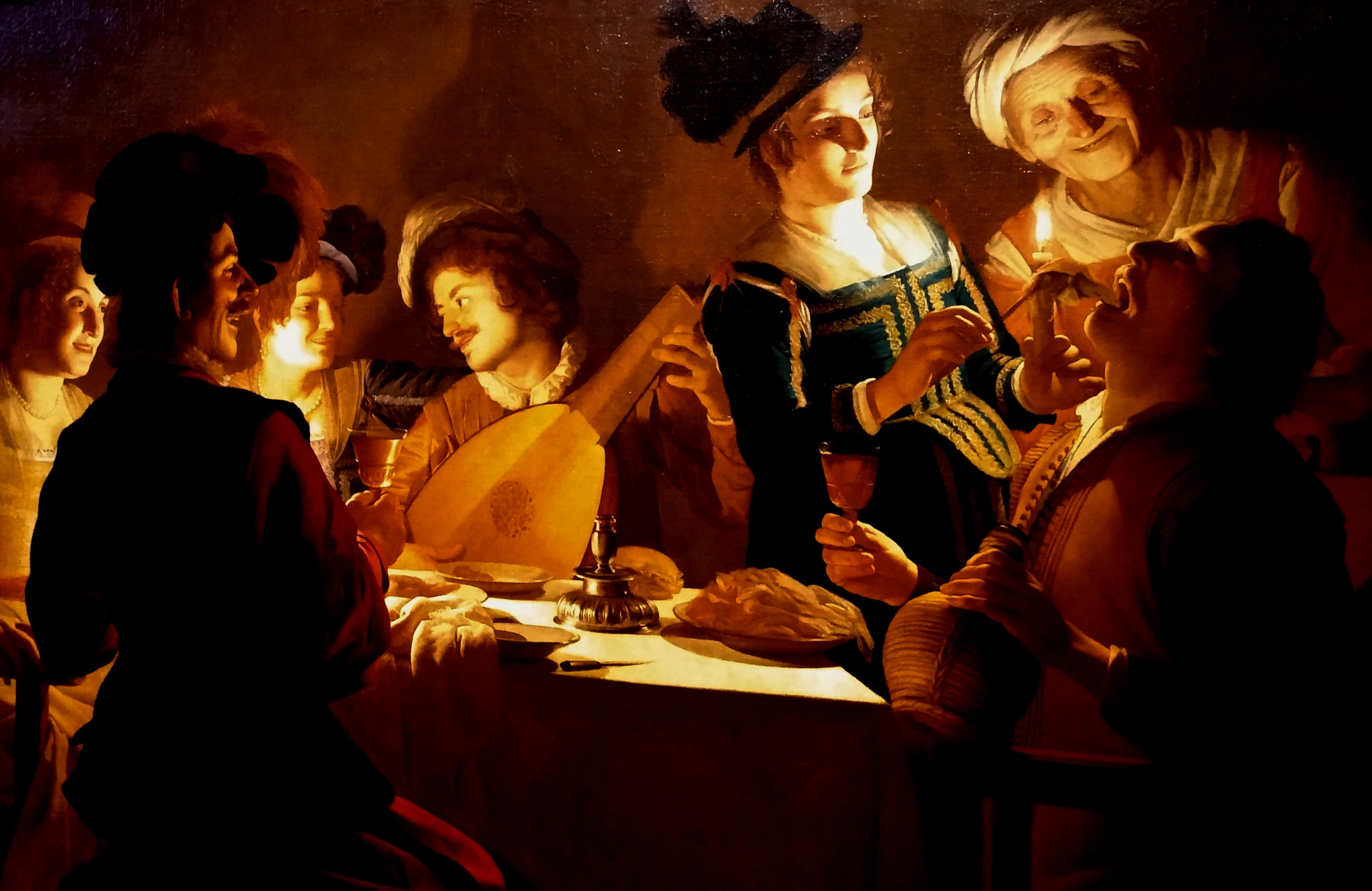
Supper with a Lute Player
Other

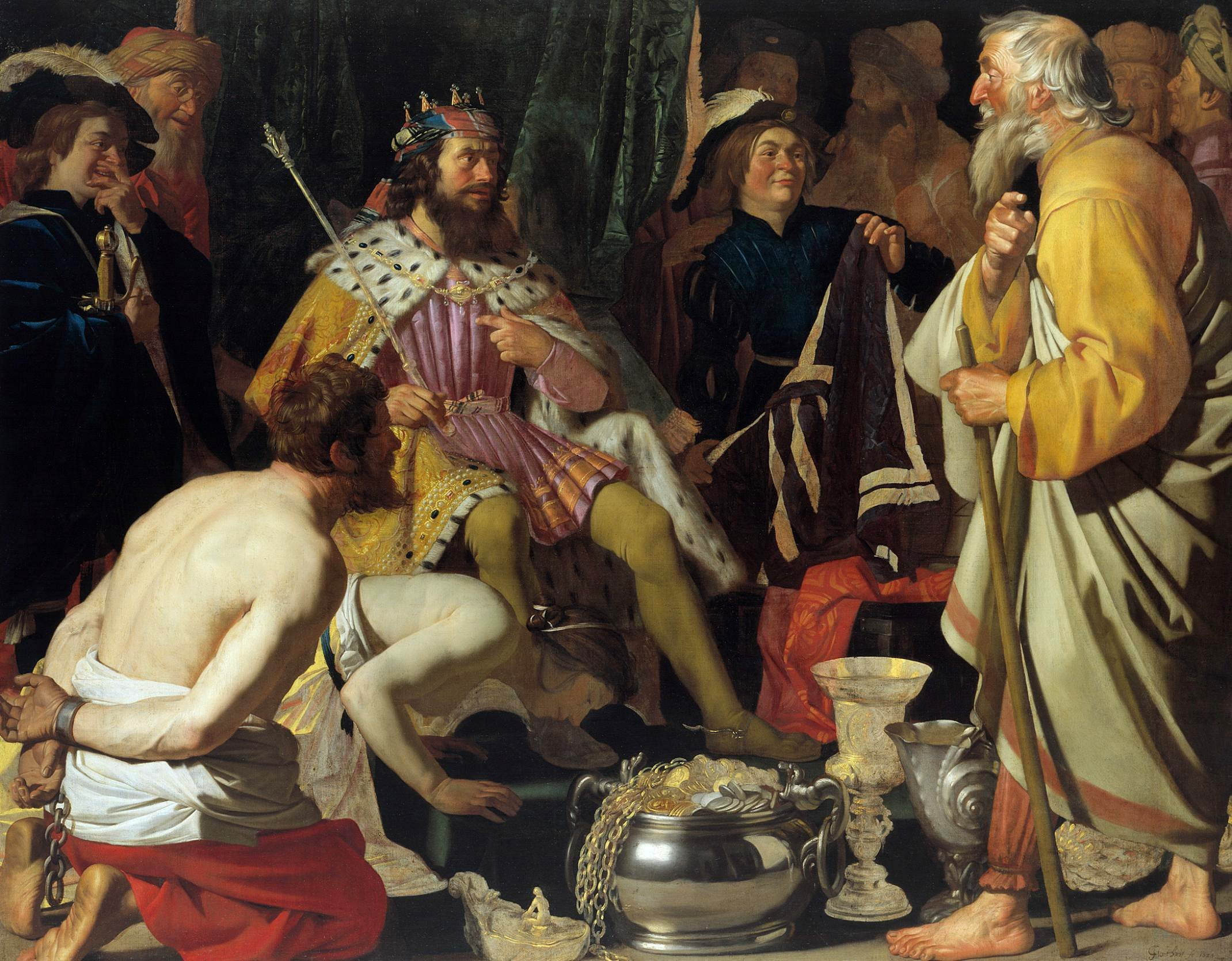
Solon and Croesus

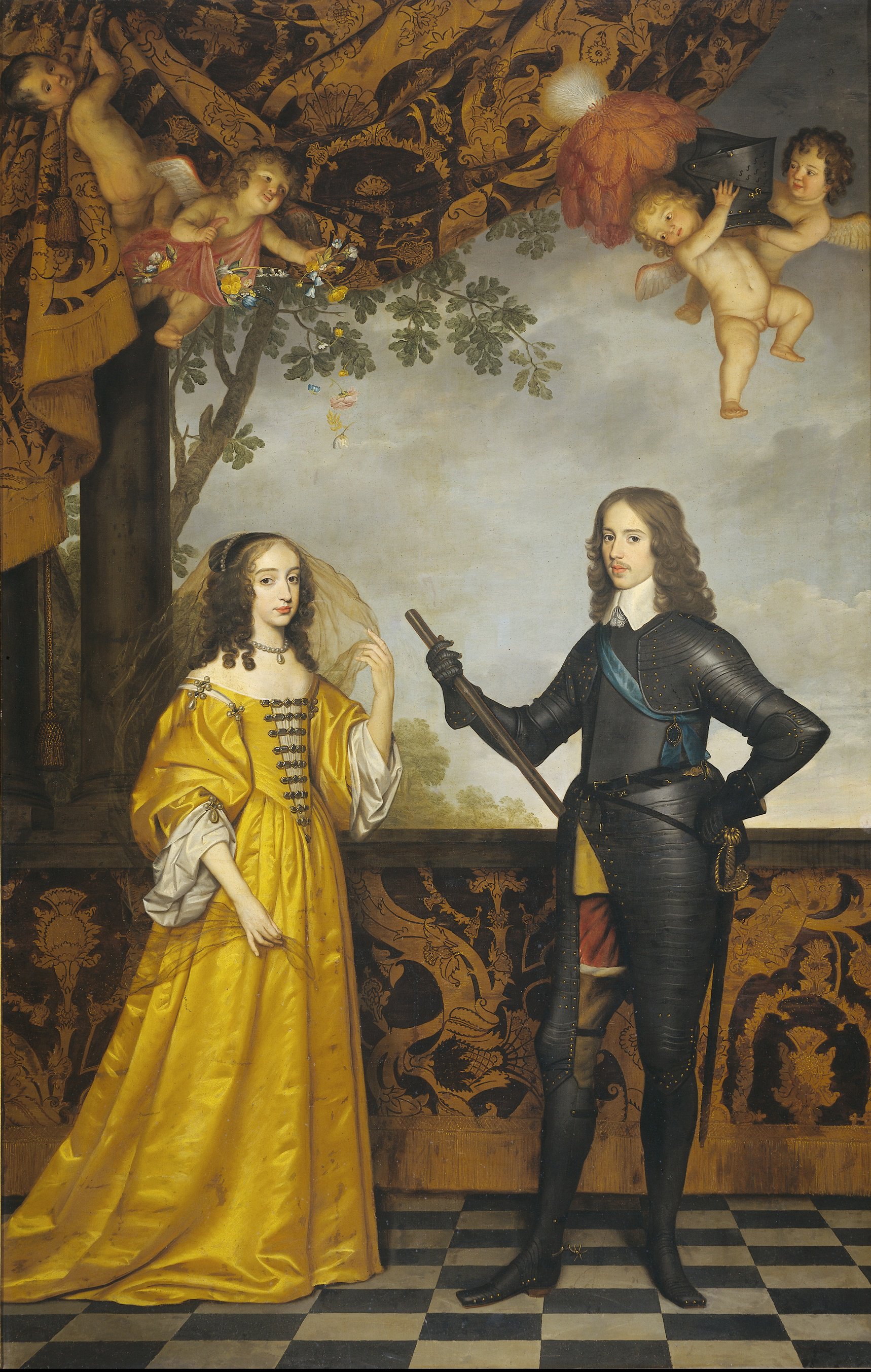
Portrait of William II (1626–50), prins of Oranje, and Maria Stuart (1631–60)

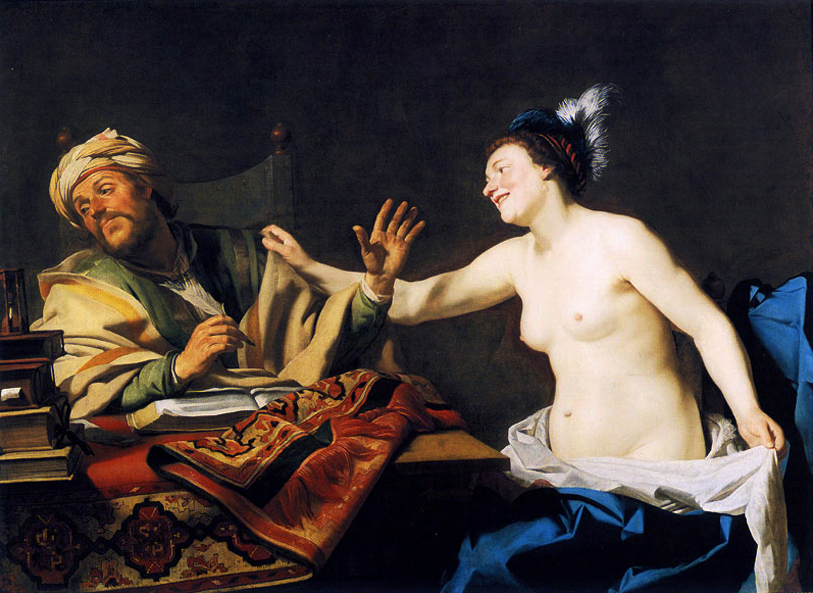
The Steadfast Philosopher, 1623 Private collection

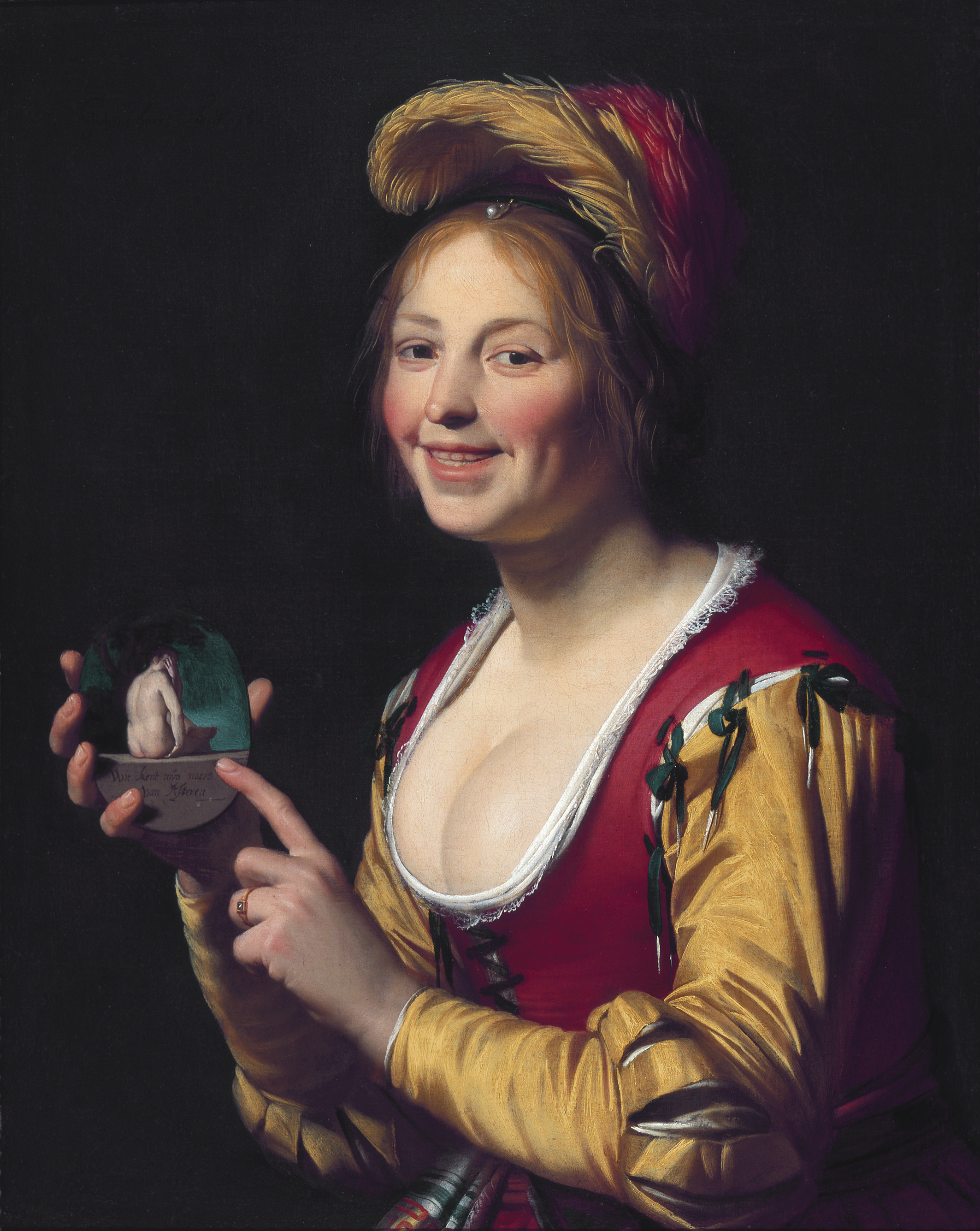
Smiling Girl, a Courtesan, Holding an Obscene Image, 1625

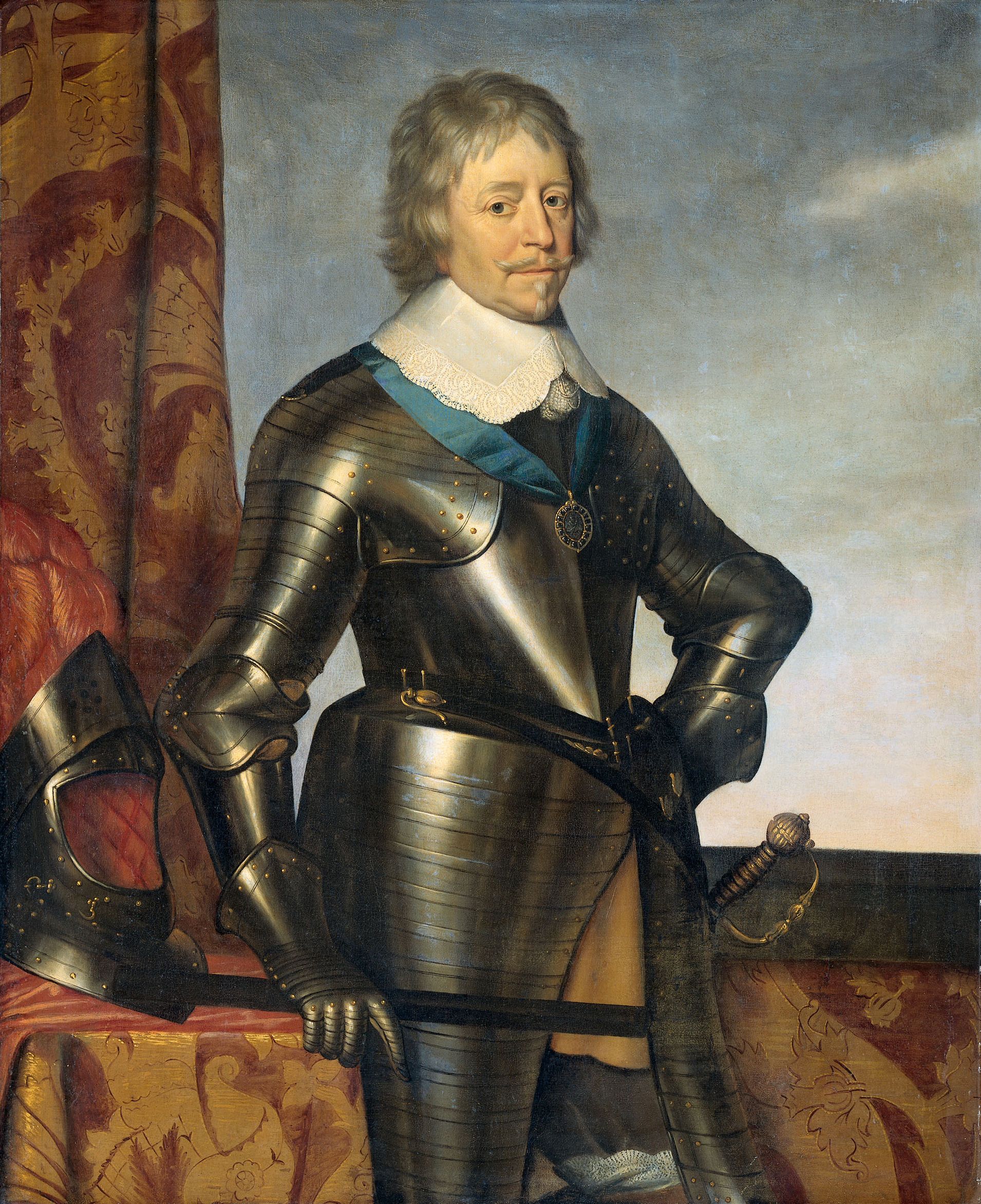
Frederick Henry, Prince of Orange, 1650

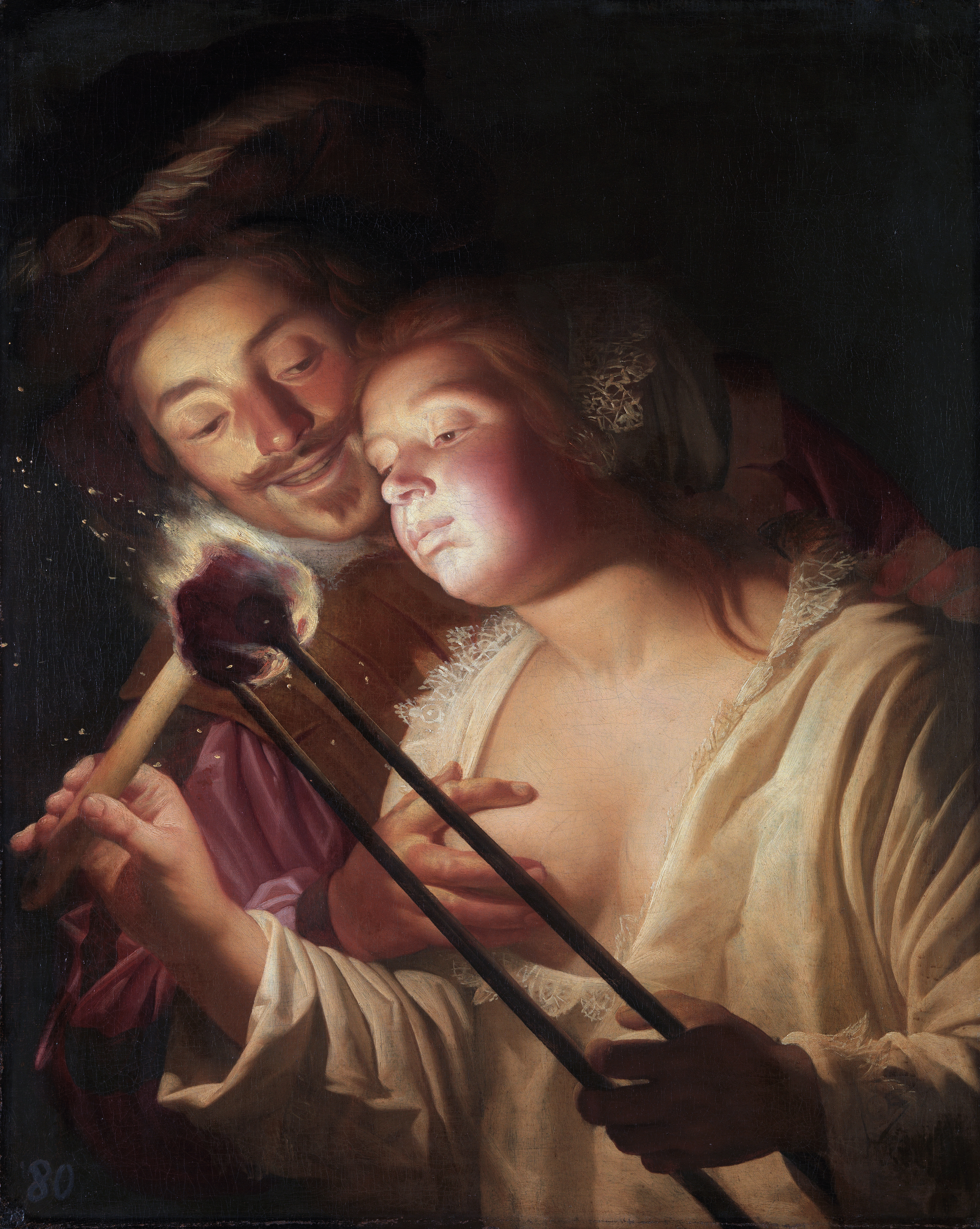
The soldier and the girl

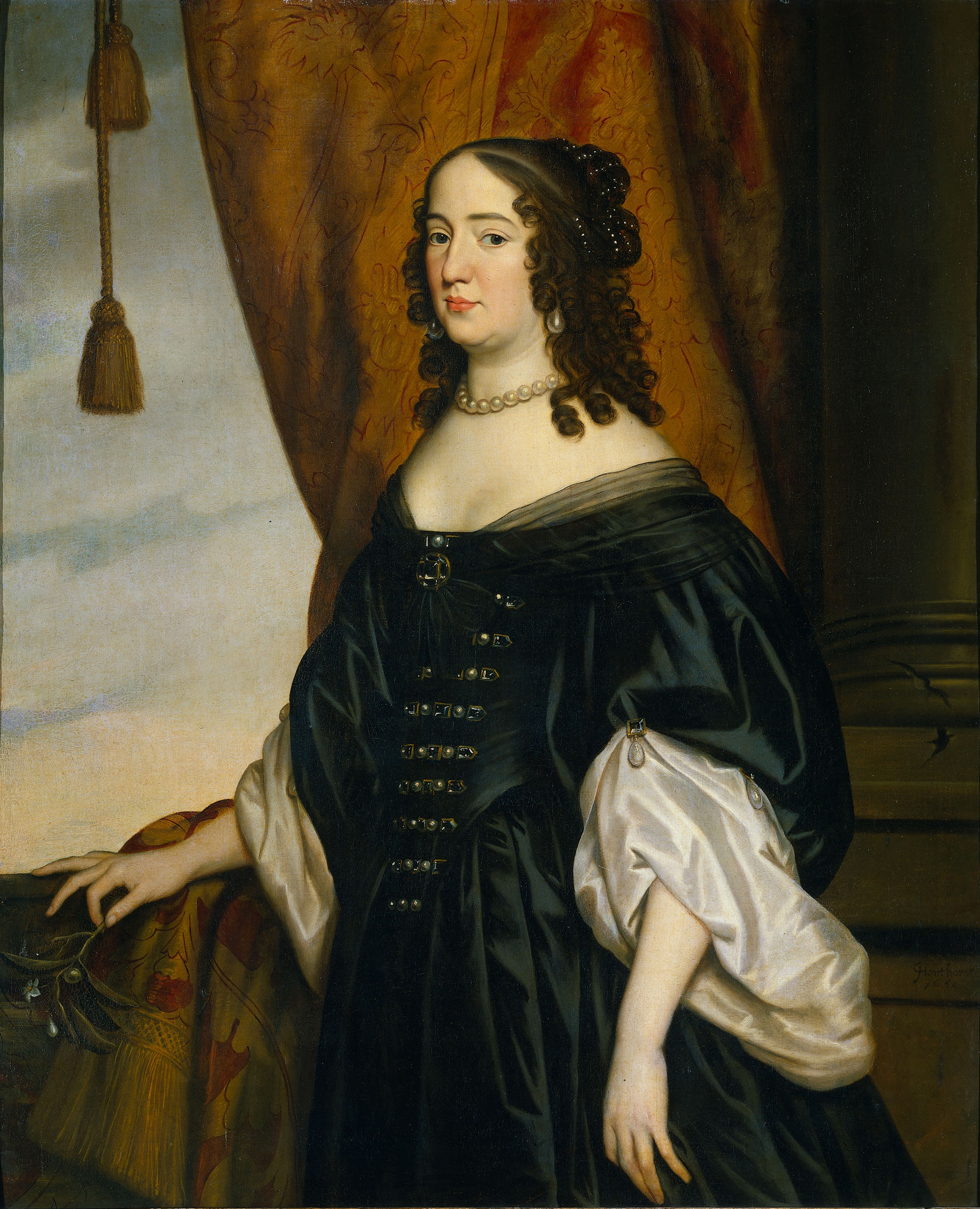
Pendant portrait of Amalia van Solms-Braunfels

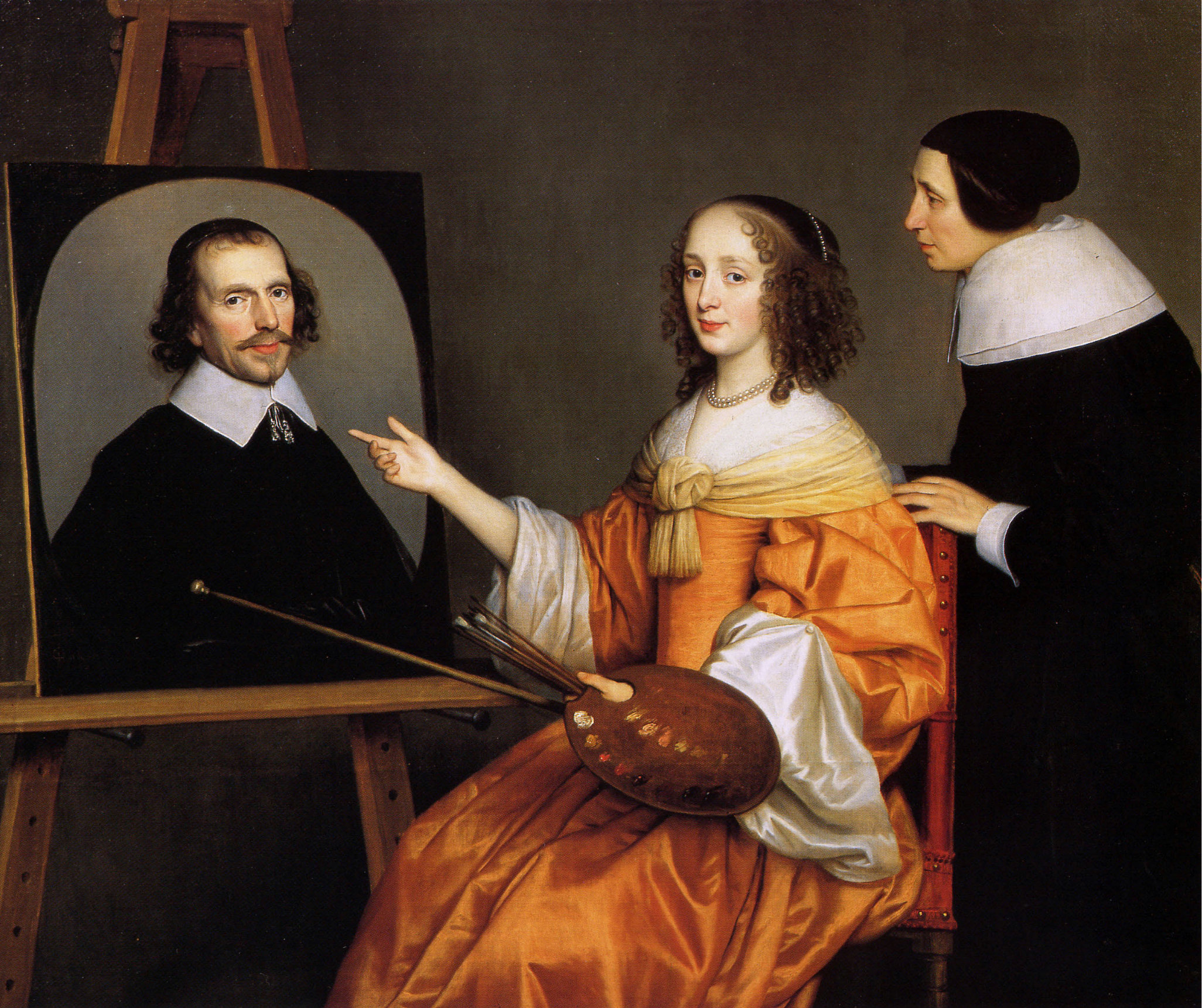
Margareta Maria de Roodere and Her Parents (c. 1652) Centraal Museum, Utrecht

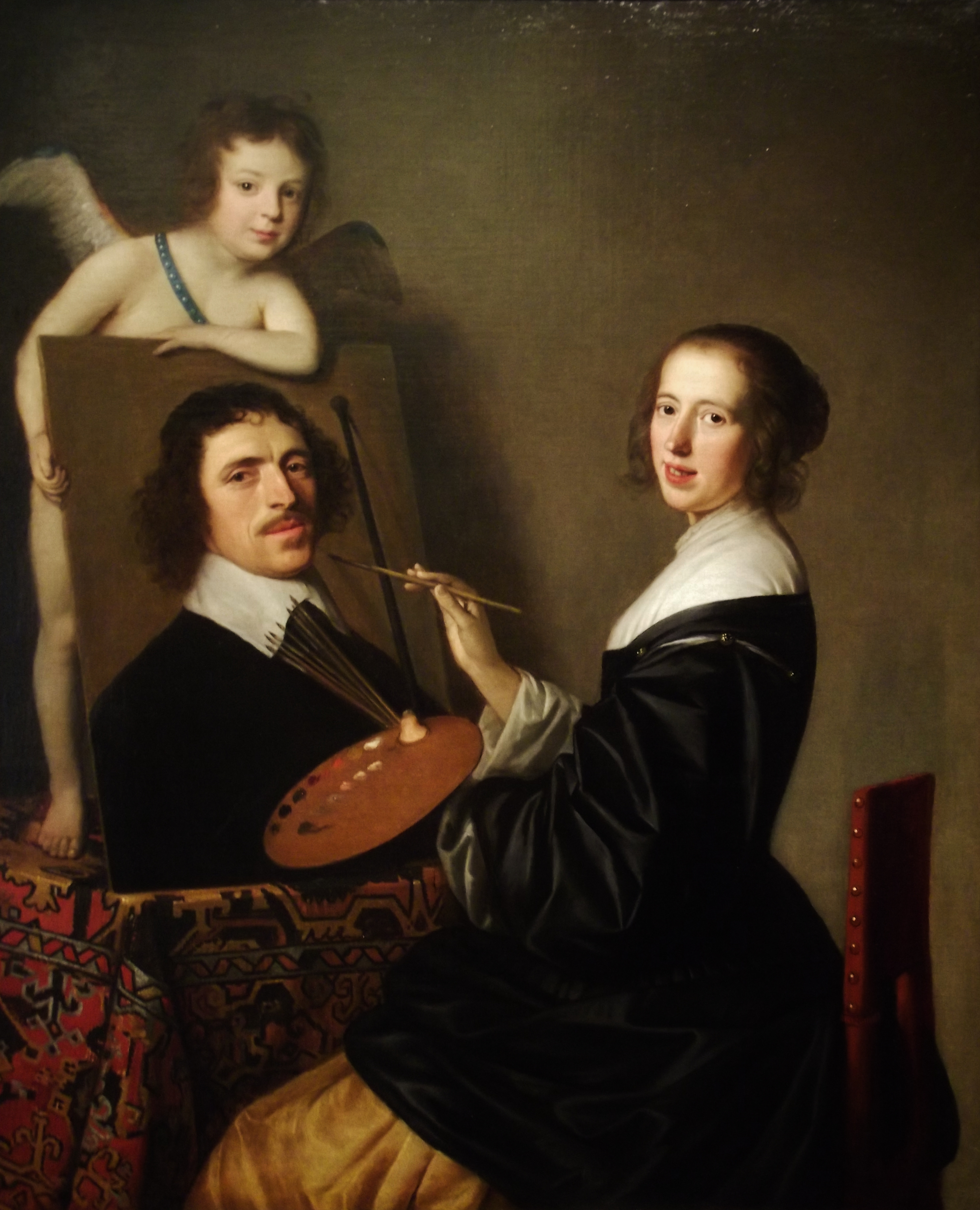
Allegory of Painting (1648) Crocker Art Museum, Sacramento, California

== Sources ==
- Brown, Christopher (1997). Utrecht Painters of the Dutch Golden Age. London: National Gallery. ISBN 1-85709-214-7.
- Filippo Baldinucci's Artists in biographies by Filippo Baldinucci, 1610–1670, p. 198 Internet Archive
