= The Matchmaker (Honthorst) =

1625 painting by Gerard van Honthorst

- De koppelaarster (Dutch)
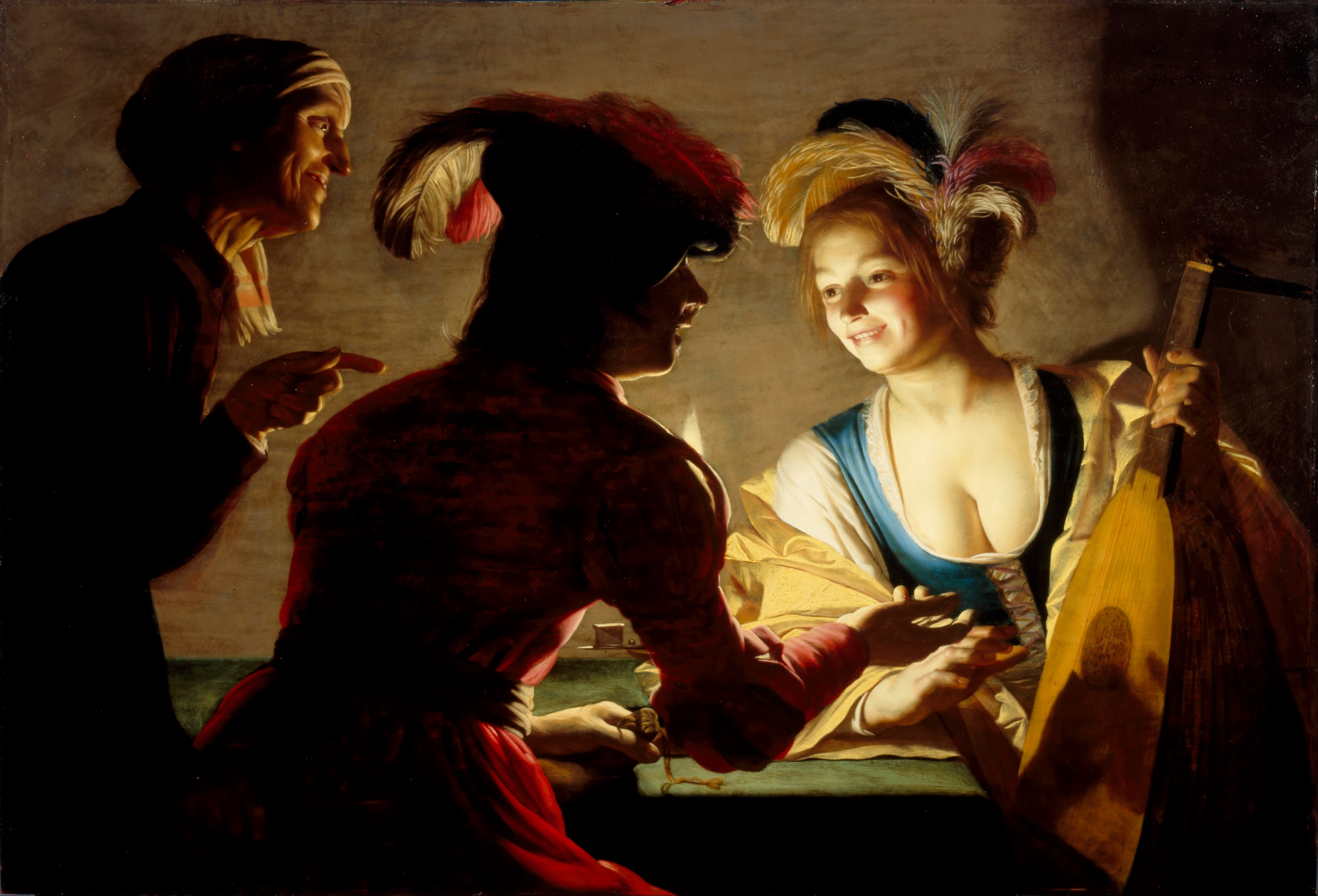
- Artist: Gerard van Honthorst
- Year: 1625
- Medium: Oil on wood
- Dimensions: 71 cm × 104 cm (28 in × 41 in)
- Location: Centraal Museum, Utrecht

The Matchmaker or The Procuress is an oil on panel painting by Dutch artist Gerard van Honthorst, created in 1625, now in the Centraal Museum in Utrecht, for which it was bought in 1951 by the Vereniging Rembrandt.

== History and description ==
Van Honthorst was part of the Utrecht Caravaggisti School. From 1610 to 1620 he stayed in Italy, where he specialized in nocturnal paintings with pronounced chiaroscuro, which earned him the nickname Gerardo delle Notti.

The painting presents a young woman with a provocative neckline and a seductive smile; she is accompanied by a man who carries a purse in his hand and an old woman. All of them are in a shallow space. The light from the candle on the table accentuates the young woman's cleavage and her colorful and feathered clothes. On the left, an old matchmaker, with a tooth protruding from her closed mouth, keeps an eye on what is happening. The lute, in this situation, refers to an object of prostitutes and therefore has an erotic meaning. The lute is also a symbol for female genitalia and lust. The painting abounds in contrasts, not only between light and darkness, but also between youth and old age. One end of the young woman's right nipple is barely noticeable.

A similarly themed painting was made by a colleague of van Honthorst, Dirck van Baburen. The model for the young woman also appears in other paintings by van Honthorst.
