= Willem van Honthorst =

Dutch Golden Age painter (1594–1666)

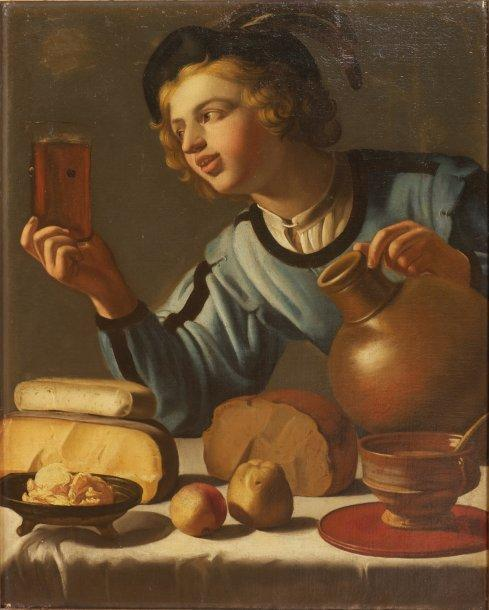
The Young Drinker

Willem van Honthorst (1594–1666), was a Dutch Golden Age painter.

He was born in Utrecht as the younger brother of Gerard van Honthorst, whose father Herman taught them to paint along with Abraham Bloemaert. Like his brother, he is known as a follower of Caravaggio and became a respected portrait painter. He was a court painter in Berlin to Countess Louise Henriette of Nassau during the years 1647–1664. He died in Utrecht.
