= SS Stad Schiedam (1942) =

History
- Name: Empire Fortune (1942–43); Van Honthorst (1943–46); Stad Schiedam (1946–61)
- Namesake: Schiedam
- Owner: Ministry of War Transport (1942–43); Dutch Government (1943–46); Halcyon Lijn (1946–62)
- Operator: Clan Line (1942–43); NV Stoomvaart Maatschappij "Rotterdam" (1943–45); NV Maatschappij Vrachtvaart (1945–46); Halcyon Lijn NV (1946–62)
- Port of registry: South Shields, United Kingdom (1942–43); The Hague, Netherlands (1943–46); Rotterdam, Netherlands (1946–61)
- Builder: John Readhead & Sons Ltd
- Yard number: 531
- Launched: 9 November 1942
- Completed: January 1943
- Maiden voyage: 9 February 1943
- Out of service: 1961
- Identification: United Kingdom Official Number 169049 (1942–43); Code Letters BFFG (1942–43); Code Letters PIDK (1943–46); Code Letters PHRO (1946–62)
- Fate: Scrapped

General characteristics
- Tonnage: 6,140 GRT, 4,108 NRT, 8,930 DWT
- Length: 405 ft 8 in (123.65 m) (LPP); 421 ft 3 in (128.40 m) (OL)
- Beam: 55 ft 5 in (16.89 m)
- Draught: 26 ft 0 in (7.92 m)
- Depth: 32 ft 8 in (9.96 m)
- Installed power: Triple expansion steam engine, 2,100ihp
- Propulsion: Single screw propeller
- Speed: 10 knots (19 km/h)
- Armament: Anti-torpedo nets (WWII)

Stad Schiedam was a 6,140 GRT cargo ship which was built in 1942 as Empire Fortune by John Readhead and Sons Ltd, South Shields, County Durham, United Kingdom for the Ministry of War Transport (MoWT). She was transferred to the Dutch Government in 1943 and was renamed Van Honthorst. She was sold to the Halcyon Lijn in 1945 and renamed Stad Schiedam, serving until she was withdrawn in 1961. She was scrapped in 1962.

== Description ==
The ship was 405 ft 8 in (123.65 m) long between perpendiculars (421 ft 3 in (128.40 m) overall), with a beam of 55 feet 5 inches (16.89 m). She had a depth of 32 feet 0 inches (9.75 m) and a draught of 26 feet 0 inches (7.92 m). She was assessed at 6,140 GRT, 4,108 NRT, 8,930 DWT.

The ship was propelled by a 2,000 ihp triple expansion steam engine, which had cylinders of 24 inches (61 cm), 41 inches (100 cm) and 69 inches (180 cm) diameter by 48 inches (120 cm) stroke. The engines were built by John Readhead & Sons Ltd. It drove a single screw propeller. The engine could propel the ship at a speed of 10 knots (19 km/h).

== History ==
Empire Fortune was built in 1942 as yard number 531 by John Readhead and Sons Ltd, South Shields, County Durham for the Ministry of War Transport (MoWT). She was launched on 9 November 1942 and completed in January 1943. Her port of registry was South Shields. The United Kingdom Official Number 1609049 and Code Letters BFFG were allocated. She was operated under the management of Clan Line.

Empire Fortune departed from the River Tyne on her maiden voyage on 9 February 1943 to join Convoy FN 939, which had departed from Southend, Essex the previous day and arrived at Methil, Fife on 10 February. She sailed the next day with Convoy EN 195, which arrived at Loch Ewe on 13 February. She sailed with Convoy JW 53 on 15 February and arrived at the Kola Inlet, Soviet Union on 27 February. Empire Fortune remained at the Kola Inlet until 1 November when she departed with Convoy RA 54A, which arrived at Loch Ewe on 14 November. She then joined Convoy WN 505A, which sailed on 16 November and arrived at Methil two days later. She joined Convoy FS 1276, which sailed that day and arrived at Southend on 20 November.

On 7 December 1943, Empire Fortune was transferred to the Dutch Government and renamed Van Honthorst. She was operated by NV Stoomvaart Maatschappij "Rotterdam", Rotterdam. The Code Letters PIDK were allocated. Her port of registry was The Hague.

Carrying stores bound for Naples, Italy, Van Honthorst sailed from Methil on 1 January 1944 with Convoy EN 327, which arrived at Loch Ewe two days later. She then joined Convoy OS 64KM, which had departed from Liverpool, Lancashire that day and split at sea on 15 January. She was in the part of the convoy that formed Convoy KMS 38G and arrived at Gibraltar on 17 January. Van Honthorst then joined Convoy KMS 38, which departed that day and arrived at Port Said, Egypt on 27 January. She left the convoy at Augusta, Sicily, Italy on 23 January. She sailed on 8 February with Convoy VN 20, which arrived at Naples on 9 February.

Van Honthorst departed with Convoy NV 24 on 3 March, arriving at Augusta the next day. She sailed on 8 March to join Convoy UGS 33, which had departed from the Hampton Roads, Virginia, United States on 13 February and arrived at Alexandria, Egypt on 12 March. She then sailed to Port Said, from where she departed on 25 March with Convoy GUS 35, which arrived at the Hampton Roads on 22 April. She left the convoy at August on 1 April. Van Honthorst departed the next day with Convoy VN 31, which arrived at Naples on 4 April. She departed on 17 April with Convoy NV 33, which arrived at Augusta the next day. She sailed on 19 April to join Convoy GUS 37, which had departed from Port Said on 14 April and arrived at the Hampton Roads on 11 May. She left the convoy at Bône, Algeria on 22 April. Van Honthorst sailed on 28 April to join Convoy KMS 48, which had departed from Gibraltar on 25 April and arrived at Port Said on 5 May. She left the convoy at Augusta on 1 May, sailing the next day with Convoy VN 37, which arrived at Naples on 3 May. She departed on 7 May with convoy NV 37, arriving at Augusta the next day. Van Honthorst sailed on 10 May to join Convoy GUS 39, which had departed from Port Said on 4 May and arrived at the Hampton Roads on 29 May. She left the convoy at Algiers, Algeria on 13 May. She sailed ten days later to join Convoy GUS 40, which had departed from Port Said on 14 May and arrived at the Hampton Roads on 9 June. She left the convoy at Oran, Algeria on 25 May.

Van Honthorst sailed from Oran on 5 July to join Convoy KMS 55, which had departed from Gibraltar the previous day and arrived at Port Said on 14 July. She left the convoy at Algiers on 6 July. She sailed on 31 July to join Convoy UGS 48, which had departed from the Hampton Roads on 14 July and arrived at Port Said on 8 August. She left the convoy at Augusta on 5 August and joined Convoy VN 57, which arrived at Naples the next day. She sailed with Convoy SM 4 on 22 August, bound for the south of France, but evidently returned to Naples. She departed on 16 September with Convoy SM 9, which arrived at the south of France on 19 September.

Van Honthorst sailed from Toulon, Var, France on 8 October with Convoy ARM 11, which arrived at Oran on 11 October. She left the convoy at Algiers that day, sailing two days later to join Convoy KMS 65, which had departed from Gibraltar on 11 October and arrived at Port Said on 21 October. She left the convoy at Augusta on 17 October, sailing two days later to join Convoy VN 72, which had departed from Naples that day and arrived at Livorno, Italy on 21 October. Van Honthorst then sailed to Gibraltar, from where she departed on 10 November to join Convoy OS 94, which formed at sea that day and dispersed at sea on 12 November. Her destination was Takoradi, Gold Coast. She subsequently returned to Gibraltar, from where she departed on 16 December with Convoy MKS 71G, which arrived at Liverpool on 24 December. She was carrying a cargo of manganese and was recorded as being fitted with anti-torpedo nets.

Van Honthorst departed from Liverpool on 1 February 1945 with Convoy OS 108KM, which split at sea on 5 February. She was carrying general cargo and is recorded as being bound for Augusta. Van Honthorst was in the part of the convoy that formed Convoy KMS 82G and arrived at Gibraltar on 9 February. Carrying a cargo of iron ore, she departed from Gibraltar on 11 March with Convoy MKS 88G, which arrived at Liverpool on 19 March. She sailed on 7 April with Convoy ON 295, which arrived at New York, United States on 26 April. She sailed on 6 May with Convoy NG 506, which arrived at Guantanamo Bay, Cuba on 13 May.

In December 1945, Van Honthorst was placed under the management of NV Maatschappij Vrachtvaars, Rotterdam. In October 1946, she was sold to the Halcyon Lijn NV, Rotterdam and was renamed Stad Schiedam. Her port of registry was changed to Rotterdam and the Code Letters PHRO were allocated. She was in service until 1961, arriving at Rotterdam for the final time on 2 December. She was then withdrawn from service. Stad Schiedam was sold to Simons Metaalhandel NV, Krimpen aan den IJssel that month for scrapping. She was sold to Van Huygen Frères, Bruges, Belgium in January 1962, and was towed by the tug Gele Zee from Rotterdam to Zeebrugge, Belgium, where she arrived on 19 January. She arrived at Bruges on 25 January.
