= Black Widow =

Black Widow or Black Widows may refer to:

- Black widow, a common name for some species of spiders in the genus Latrodectus

== Arts and entertainment ==
=== Fictional characters ===
- Black Widow (Natasha Romanova)
- Black Widow (Yelena Belova)
- Black Widow (Claire Voyant)
- Black Widows (Marvel Cinematic Universe)
- The Black Widow, a Batman villain played by Tallulah Bankhead
- Black Widow, a character from the Saturday Night Slam Masters series of games by Capcom
- Natasha Kerensky, in Tales of the Black Widow Company, a supplement for the BattleTech video game

=== Film and television ===
- The Black Widow (serial), a 1947 movie serial starring Bruce Edwards
- Black Widow (1951 film), a British film starring Christine Norden
- Black Widow (1954 film), a film starring Ginger Rogers and Gene Tierney
- Black Widow (1987 film), a film featuring Debra Winger and Theresa Russell
- Black Widow (2003 film), a film directed by Brad Turner
- The Black Widow (2005 film) or Before It Had a Name, a film by Giada Colagrande
- Black Widow (2005 film), a Canadian film starring Sarah Slean
- Black Widow (2007 film), a film with Elizabeth Berkley and Alicia Coppola
- Black Widow (2010 film), a film starring Jack Scalia and Jennifer O'Dell
- Black Widow (2021 film), a film starring Scarlett Johansson based on the Marvel Comics character
- Black Widow: A Land Bleeds, a 2017 Indian film
- Black Widows (2016 TV series), Scandinavian TV serial
- Black Widows (Indian TV series), a 2020 web series
- "The Black Widow", an episode of Boston Legal
- "Black Widow" (Marvel Studios: Legends), an episode of Marvel Studios: Legends

=== Literature ===
- Black Widow, a car driven by the Spider (DC Comics)
- The Black Widow (Silva novel), a 2016 novel by Daniel Silva
- Black Widow: A Novel, a 1981 novel by Christina Crawford

=== Gaming ===
- Black Widow (video game), a 1982 Atari arcade game
- Black Widow Games, a computer games developer

=== Music ===
- Black Widow (opera), by Thomas Pasatieri
- Black Widow (band), a British rock band
- Black Widow (Black Widow album) (1971)
- Black Widow (Lalo Schifrin album) (1976)
- Black Widow (In This Moment album) (2014)
- The Black Widow (album)
- Black Widow Records, an Italian label

==== Songs ====
- "Black Widow" (Iggy Azalea song) (2014)
- "Black Widow" (Pristin song) (2017)
- "Black Widow", by Black Tide from Light from Above
- "Black Widow", by Mötley Crüe from Red, White & Crüe
- "Black Widow", by Children of Bodom from Hatebreeder
- "Black Widow", by U.D.O. from Animal House
- "Black Widow", by Dolores O'Riordan from Are You Listening?
- "Black Widow", by Donovan Leitch from Slow Down World
- "Black Widow", by In This Moment from Black Widow
- "Black Widow", by Lita Ford from Dangerous Curves
- "Black Widow", by Michelle Shocked from Short Sharp Shocked
- "Black Widow", by Alice Cooper from Welcome to My Nightmare
- "Black Widow", by Jefferson Starship from Winds of Change
- "Black Widow", by Booty Luv
- "Black Widow", by Link Wray and His Ray Men, B-side to "Jack the Ripper"
- "Black Widow", by Cage the Elephant from Melophobia
- "Black Widow", by Susanne Sundfør from The Brothel
- "Black Widows", by Grave Digger from The Last Supper

=== Rides ===
- Black Widow (ride), an amusement ride at Kennywood
- Black Widow, a roller coaster at Six Flags New England

== Military ==
- Northrop P-61 Black Widow, a World War II night fighter
- PMN mine, nicknamed Black Widow because of their dark casing
- Soviet submarine B-39, nicknamed Black Widow after having been sold off as a museum ship
- 421st Fighter Squadron, nicknamed Black Widows

== Other plants and animals ==
- Black tetra, also known as "black widow tetra", a freshwater fish
- Black brotula or black widow, an ocean fish
- Geranium phaeum or black widow, an herbaceous plant species

== People ==
=== Murderers ===
- Black Widow Gang, Colombian serial killer group arrested in 2011, also called "The Black Widows of Colombia"
- Black Widows of Liverpool, two Irish sisters hanged for murder in 1884
- Bodenfelde Black Widow, German serial killer and her accomplice, convicted in 2008
- Black Widow Murders, murders committed in 1999 and 2005 by two elderly women in Los Angeles
- Marie Alexandrine Becker (1879–1942), Belgian serial killer convicted of 11 murders, also called the "Belgian Borgia"
- Griselda Blanco (1943–2012), Colombian drug trafficker, known for ordering or committing the murders of three ex-husbands
- Elfriede Blauensteiner (1931–2003), Austrian serial killer, used money inherited from dead husbands to fund her compulsive gambling habit
- Stacey Castor (1967–2016), poisoned two husbands with antifreeze in 2000 and 2005, also attempted to murder and frame her daughter for the deaths
- Esneda Ruiz Cataño (born 1968), Colombian serial killer of husbands for life insurance benefits from 2001 to 2010; is currently in El Pedregal Prison
- Mary Ann Cotton (1832–1873), English murderer and suspected serial killer
- Nannie Doss (1905–1965), American serial killer, also called the "Giggling Granny"
- Margit Filó (1914–1979), Hungarian serial killer, called the "Rókus Black Widow"
- Heloísa Gonçalves Duque Soares Ribeiro (born 1950), Brazilian-American murderer and suspected serial killer, currently on the run
- Belle Gunness, 25–40 victims spanning from 1884 to 1908
- Chisako Kakehi (1946–2024), Japanese serial killer who poisoned her lovers with cyanide
- Christine Malèvre (born 1970), French serial killer and nurse, nicknamed "the black widow" by her colleagues
- Blanche Taylor Moore (born 1933), poisoned two husbands and one long-term boyfriend with arsenic
- Martha Needle (1863–1894), Australian serial killer hanged at Old Melbourne Gaol, called the "Black Widow of Richmond"
- Betty Neumar (1931–2011), subject of a BBC documentary called Black Widow Granny?, died before trial
- Catherine Nevin (1950–2018), Irish woman who arranged for her husband to be murdered in a staged robbery of the pub they owned
- Patrizia Reggiani (born 1948), Italian socialite who hired a hitman to kill her ex-husband, Maurizio Gucci
- Vera Renczi (1903–1960), possibly-apocryphal Hungarian woman said to have murdered 35 men in the 1920s
- Margarita Sánchez Gutiérrez (born 1953), Spanish woman called the "Black Widow of Barcelona"
- Melissa Ann Shepard (born 1935), Canadian murderer and fraudster, sometimes called the "Internet Black Widow"
- Lyda Southard (1892–1958), American serial killer, also called "Flypaper Lyda"
- Dena Thompson (born 1960), British murderer and fraudster, gave her husband poisoned curry
- Lynn Turner (murderer) (1968–2010), poisoned two husbands with antifreeze in 1995 and 2001
- Áurea Vázquez-Rijos, Puerto Rican woman who arranged the murder of Adam Anhang

=== Athletes ===
- Jeanette Lee (born 1971), pool player
- Sonya Thomas (born 1967), competitive eater

=== Other ===
- Florentine Rost van Tonningen (1914–2007), Dutch neo-Nazi nicknamed Zwarte weduwe (Black Widow)

== Other uses ==
- Black widow pulsar, a type of pulsar
  - Black Widow Pulsar, the first known example
- Black Widow (paint mix), paint mix for projection screen
- Black Widow (Chechnya), term for female suicide bombers from Chechnya or Dagestan
- Black Widow or DHD(J), a subgroup of the militant Dimasa organization Dima Halam Daogah of Assam, India

== See also ==
- "Black Widow Pt. 2", a song by RZA featuring ODB on the album Digital Bullet
- Black Widow II, a Northrop YF-23 prototype fighter aircraft, nicknamed after the P-61
- Black Widower (disambiguation)
- A Widow's Game, a 2025 Spanish film originally titled La viuda negra, "The Black Widow".
- Black Widow (Marvel Comics), a list of characters from Marvel Comics
