= The Rembrandt Affair =

2010 novel by Daniel Silva

- The Rembrandt Affair
- Author: Daniel Silva
- Language: English
- Series: Gabriel Allon series
- Genre: Spy fiction, crime, mystery, thriller
- Publisher: G. P. Putnam's Sons (US)
- Publication date: 2010
- Publication place: United States
- Media type: Print
- Pages: 484
- ISBN: 9780399156588 (US)
- Preceded by: The Defector
- Followed by: Portrait of a Spy

The Rembrandt Affair is a 2010 spy novel by Daniel Silva. It is the tenth in the Gabriel Allon series, based in the world of Israeli intelligence.

== Background ==
In this novel, Silva returns to the historical milieu of the second Allon novel, The English Assassin (2002), that is, the looting of artworks by Nazi leaders and the subsequent appropriation of the art by Swiss bankers with whom the loot was deposited.

Part of the reason that Silva delved into the topic of art theft was the realization of the impact it has on the art world. Beginning with the role it played during and after the Holocaust, art theft has continued into the present. Each year, between four and six billion dollars' worth of art and antiquities are stolen, ranking it as the fourth-most lucrative crime behind drug trafficking, arms dealing, and money laundering. Silva touched on arms trafficking when dealing with the crimes of Ivan Kharkov in The Defector and Moscow Rules. Silva was also intrigued by the greed that drove people such as Bernie Madoff and he, and some other key figures in the Great Recession were the inspiration behind this book's villain, Martin Landesmann.

== Plot ==
When a newly surfaced Rembrandt portrait is stolen and its restorer murdered, art conservator and Israeli operative Gabriel Allon follows a trail that links wartime looting, modern finance, and a billionaire philanthropist.

== Reception ==
Like others in Silva's Gabriel Allon series, this book was a New York Times bestseller.

The Rembrandt Affair marked Silva's last book with Putnam after he signed a deal with HarperCollins following Rembrandt's publication.

== See also ==
- Nazi plunder
