= The New Girl (Silva novel) =

2019 spy novel by Daniel Silva

- First edition (US)
- Author: Daniel Silva
- Language: English
- Series: Gabriel Allon series
- Published: 2019
- Publisher: HarperCollins
- Publication date: July 16, 2019
- Publication place: United States
- Media type: Hardcover
- Pages: 497
- ISBN: 978-0-0628-3483-6
- Preceded by: The Other Woman
- Followed by: The Order
- Website: The New Girl

The New Girl is a spy novel by Daniel Silva. It is the nineteenth novel in the Gabriel Allon series. It was released on July 16, 2019 and debuted at the top of the New York Times bestseller list on August 4.

== Plot ==
A twelve-year-old girl is kidnapped from an exclusive school in Switzerland. She is the only child of Khalid bin Mohammed, the crown prince of Saudi Arabia. This prince contacts Gabriel Allon, the head of Israeli intelligence, to find his daughter. Allon agrees, but when he and the prince are about to rescue her, Allon realizes she has a bomb strapped under her coat. She dies, and the prince survives. However, since the ransom he had to pay was abdication from the succession, he is no longer the crown prince. Gradually it becomes clear that his uncle Abdullah engineered his downfall to satisfy the Russian government, to which the uncle was deeply in debt. Uncle Abdullah is now named heir to the throne. Since neither Israel nor the United Kingdom wishes to see Saudi Arabia become a puppet of Russia, Allon works with MI6 to convince Russia that Abdullah is in fact a secret partisan of Britain. As they expected, Russia sends operatives to kill the supposedly treacherous Abdullah with a radioactive poison.

Among the featured characters are ex-CIA operative Sarah Bancroft (last seen in Portrait of a Spy, 2011), who has been advising the crown prince on art acquisitions, and, from the preceding Allon novel, Rebecca Manning/Philby, who is now working from Moscow.

== Relationship to the career of Mohammed bin Salman ==
In addition to the Author's Note which accompanies most of the books in the Gabriel Allon series, Daniel Silva introduces The New Girl with a Foreword detailing how actual events interfered with this novel. He explains that his manuscript became problematical in October 2018, because of the murder of the journalist Jamal Khashoggi, apparently at the behest of Mohammed bin Salman, the crown prince of Saudi Arabia, known widely as "MBS." Up until, then, MBS had seemed progressive and even friendly to Israel. In The New Girl Gabriel Allon assists and advises a character who bears many similarities to MBS. Silva's Khalid bin Mohammed is known as KBM, and, like MBS, has acquired the painting Salvator Mundi attributed to Leonardo da Vinci and a unique superyacht. Silva began his novel again, this time making his Saudi prince guilty of a killing almost identical to Khashoggi's, although the novel's version of the prince is "redeemable" through loss. Silva comments, "If I were to identify the spine of this novel it's that I turned [Khalid] into the MBS we all hoped he would be, and who he promised to be."

== Reception ==
It received reviews from Kirkus, Booklist, and the Pittsburgh Post-Gazette.
