= English Girl =

English Girl or English Girls may refer to:

- The English Girl, novel by Daniel Silva
- "English Girls", song by Sarah Brightman from Anything But Lonely
- "English Girls", song by The Maine from American Candy
- "English Girls", song by Mungo Jerry Ray Dorset 1976
- "English Girls", song by Peter Sarstedt Sarstedt 1981
