= Chisako =

Chisako is a Japanese female given name. Notable people with the name include:

- Chisako Hara (1936–2020), Japanese actress
- Chisako Jumonji (born 1988), known as Dash Chisako, Japanese professional wrestler
- Chisako Kakehi (1946–2024), Japanese serial killer, sentenced to death
- Chisako Takashima (born 1968), Japanese tarento and violinist
- Chisako Wakatake (born 1954), Japanese writer
