= The English Assassin =

The English Assassin may refer to:

- The English Assassin: A Romance of Entropy, a 1972 novel by British writer Michael Moorcock
- The English Assassin (Daniel Silva novel), a 2002 spy novel by Daniel Silva
