= The Secret Servant =

The Secret Servant may refer to:

- The Secret Servant (Silva novel), a 2007 spy novel by Daniel Silva
- The Secret Servant (Lyall novel), a 1980 third person narrative novel by Gavin Lyall
