= A Death in Vienna =

2004 spy novel by Daniel Silva

- A Death in Vienna
- Author: Daniel Silva
- Language: English
- Series: Gabriel Allon series
- Genre: Spy, crime, mystery, thriller
- Publisher: G. P. Putnam's Sons (US)
- Publication date: 2004
- Publication place: United States
- Media type: Print
- Pages: 403
- ISBN: 0399151435 (US)
- Preceded by: The Confessor
- Followed by: Prince of Fire

A Death in Vienna is a 2004 spy novel by Daniel Silva. It is the fourth book in the Gabriel Allon series.

== Plot summary ==
An Israeli-run Holocaust research office in Vienna is bombed, resulting in the death of the two female staff and serious injury to the Director. Gabriel Allon, a former assassin for 'The Office' and working under a new identity as an art restorer in Venice, is requested by former director Ari Shamron to go to Vienna to investigate. He is approached by Max Klein, a Holocaust survivor who claims to have information about a man named Ludwig Vogel. After following up this information, Allon finds Klein has been murdered. Allon is apprehended by Austrian security police and expelled from the country.

At the Yad Vashem, research reveals that Vogel is probably a Nazi war criminal and former SD officer named Erich Radek. Radek was the engineer behind Aktion 1005, a Nazi operation to conceal the atrocities of the Holocaust by exhuming mass graves and burning the bodies so that no trace of them ever existed. Radek visited half a dozen concentration camps as a part of Aktion 1005, and it is suggested that even he is unaware how many bodies were burned. Allon is disturbed by Radek's resemblance to a painting his mother made of one of her tormentors during the Death Marches.

The trail to establish Vogel's true identity takes Allon to the Vatican, where he obtains information that the Vatican would rather not be known: that Radek was one of many escaping Nazis helped and sheltered by the Vatican. The trail further takes him to Argentina where Radek is supposedly buried. Finding the grave and headstone of 'Radek', Allon is nearly killed by an assassin who has been following him, a man known only as "the Clockmaker". He is rescued by CIA agents who have also been trailing him and the assassin escapes.

In Langley the CIA admit that Radek was one of many Nazis recruited to set up an intelligence network in Germany in order to spy on the Soviet Union, laying a false trail through Italy, Syria and Argentina as misdirection. He is also the trustee of several billion dollars' worth of investments, based on looted money and assets, which are now controlled by a Swiss banker. These assets were seeded throughout the Swiss and Austrian Alps by Nazi Party members fleeing the Allied invasion, where they were placed in escrow for a generation before National Socialism could be a viable political stance once more. Radek has since retired and is regarded by the CIA as 'disposable'. The CIA agree to cooperate in his kidnap by the Israelis. The Prime Minister of Israel reluctantly approves the operation.

With the enforced assistance of the Swiss banker, who controls the secret bank accounts and investments, Radek is enticed into the hands of a kidnap team in Vienna. Drugged and hidden in a van, he is spirited across the border into the Czech Republic and thence into Poland. He is taken to the memorial on the site of the extermination camp at Treblinka, one of the sites he visited as part of Aktion 1005. Allon reveals that he knows Radek has a son, Peter Metzler, who is on the verge of being elected as Chancellor of Austria. Armed with the money from the Swiss bank, Metzler would be able to reintroduce Nazism to Austria unopposed. Allon uses this knowledge to convince Radek to surrender, or else his connection to Metzler will be revealed and Metzler's political career will be ruined. Radek is taken to Israel and placed in solitary confinement. In return for not being tried and executed, he is to prepare a detailed history of Aktion 1005, which he was heavily involved in.

In Vienna, Metzler is duly elected. The knowledge that he is actually Radek's son is kept secret, known only to the CIA and The Office while Allon returns to his restoration work in Venice. In Vienna, the Clockmaker receives a parcel bomb and is killed.

== International titles ==
- Portuguese: Morte em Viena. (Death in Vienna). (2009). ISBN 9789722520249
- German: Der Zeuge.

== Sources ==
- Silva, Daniel. A Death in Vienna. Signet: 2004
