= The Collector (Silva novel) =

2023 novel by Daniel Silva

- Cover of the 2023 HarperCollins edition
- Author: Daniel Silva
- Language: English
- Publisher: Harper, An Imprint of HarperCollins Publishers
- Publication date: 2023

The Collector is a 2023 novel by Daniel Silva, the 23rd novel in the author's Gabriel Allon series. The book debuted at #2 on the New York Times bestseller list.

== Plot ==
The story takes place against the background of the 2022 Russian invasion of Ukraine, and also the rising concerns about climate change. Gabriel Allon has retired from Israeli intelligence, but he is asked by Italian authorities to look into the theft of a painting from a private collector. The painting, which turns out to be Vermeer's The Concert, has been missing for over thirty years, since it was stolen from the Isabella Stewart Gardner Museum. Allon tracks down the thief, as well as the wealthy oil executive who commissioned the theft. In the process, he learns about a more important theft, of materials for a nuclear bomb. He recruits both the thief and the oil tycoon to steal a deadly secret plan from a Moscow official.
