= Portrait of a Spy =

2011 novel by Daniel Silva

- Portrait of a Spy
- Author: Daniel Silva
- Language: English
- Series: Gabriel Allon series
- Genre: Spy fiction, crime, mystery, thriller
- Publisher: Harper (US)
- Publication date: 2011
- Publication place: United States
- Media type: Print (hardback)
- Pages: 455
- ISBN: 9780062072184 (US); 0062072188 (US)
- Preceded by: The Rembrandt Affair
- Followed by: The Fallen Angel

Portrait of a Spy is a 2011 spy novel by Daniel Silva. It is the eleventh title in the Gabriel Allon series.

Other than the traditional recurring characters, the book features the return of Sarah Bancroft and Nadia al Bakari, daughter of Zizi al Bakari who was Allon's foe in The Messenger.

Like others in Silva's Allon series, Portrait of a Spy is a New York Times bestseller.

This was Silva's first book with HarperCollins, following his departure from Putnam after the publication of The Rembrandt Affair in 2010.
