= The Heist (Silva novel) =

2014 novel by Daniel Silva

- First edition (US)
- Author: Daniel Silva
- Language: English
- Series: Gabriel Allon series
- Genre: Spy fiction Thriller
- Publisher: HarperCollins
- Publication place: United States
- Media type: Print (hardback and paperback)
- Preceded by: The English Girl
- Followed by: The English Spy

The Heist is a 2014 spy novel by Daniel Silva. It is the fourteenth in the Gabriel Allon series. It was released in July 2014, and within two weeks was a New York Times Bestseller. It focused on the recovery of stolen art work.

== Plot and issues ==
Gabriel Allon, the protagonist, leaves his pregnant wife in Venice to pursue a painting by Caravaggio stolen in 1969, on behalf of the Italian Art Squad. Silva explores the practices of rich criminals hoarding stolen artworks as assets, and has Allon visit the Geneva Freeport. Allon discovers a link between the stolen art and the Syrian regime, which is engaged in a horrific civil war. Anticipating taking over as head of the Israeli secret intelligence agency, Allon assembles an expanded team in Tel Aviv, hoping to gain leverage to help the Syrian populace.

Paintings crucial to the plot of The Heist

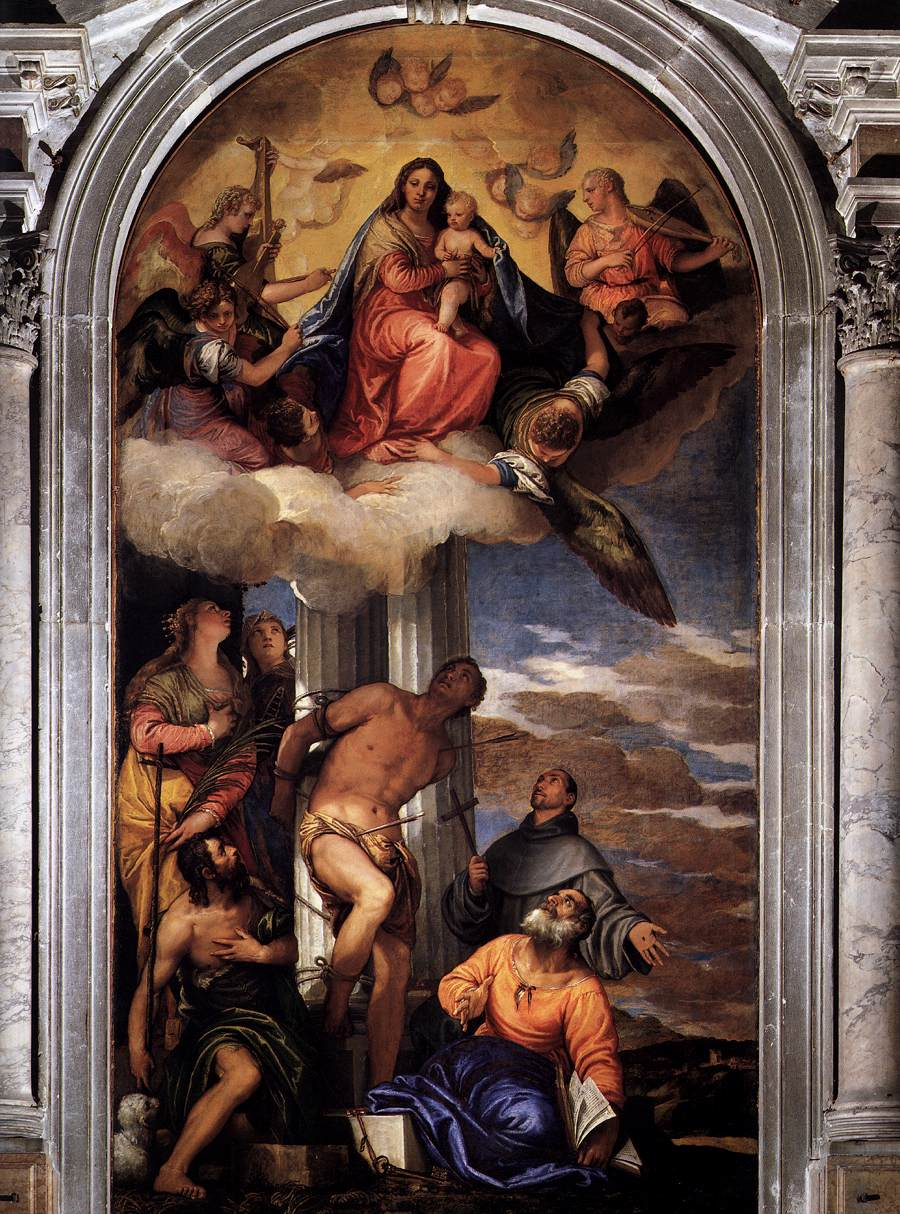
Virgin Assumed with Saints by Paolo Veronese (restored in Venice by Allon)

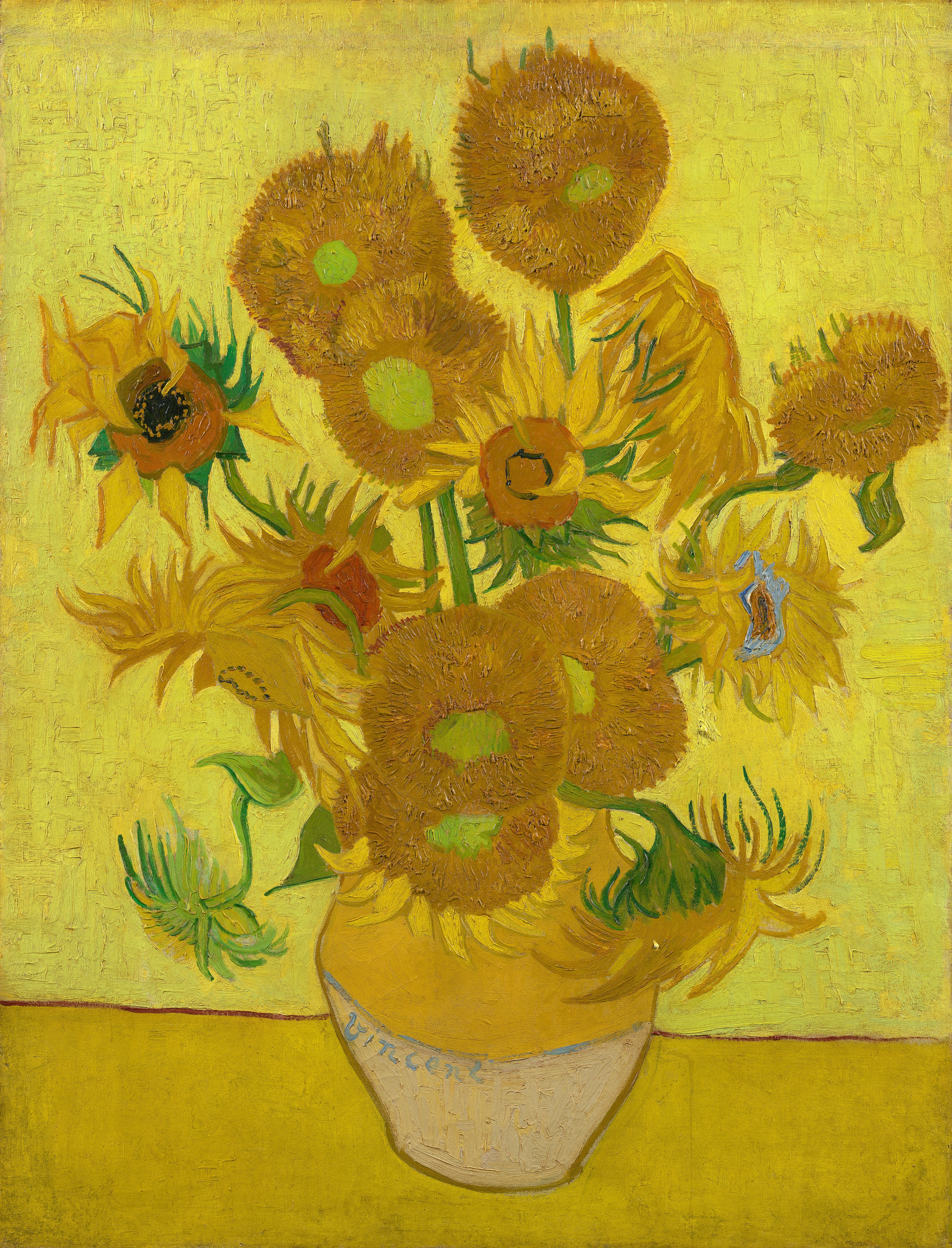
Sunflowers by Van Gogh (whose theft Allon engineers, and of which he then paints a copy)

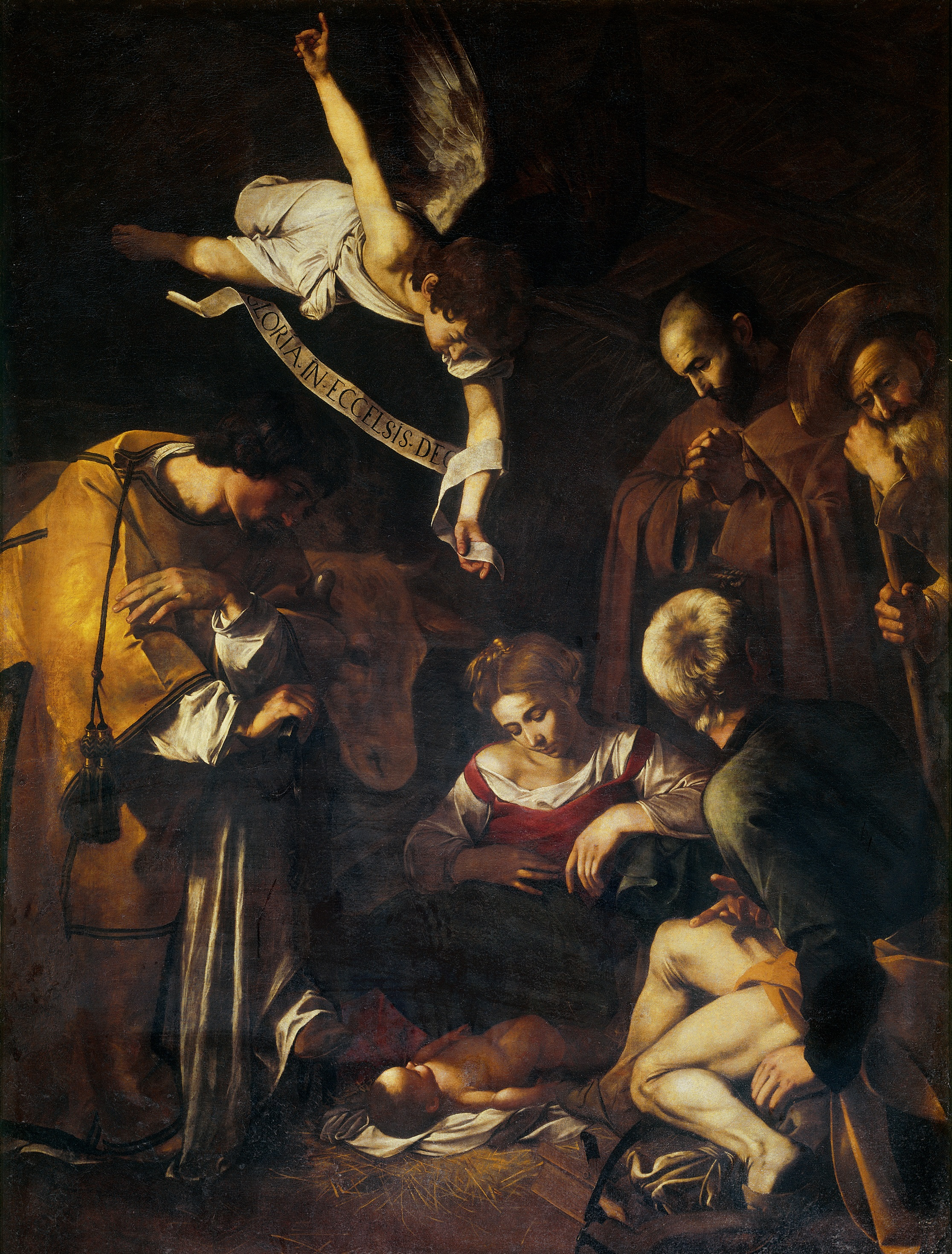
Nativity with St. Francis and St. Lawrence by Caravaggio (a stolen painting Allon hopes to recover)
