= Gabriel Allon =

Protagonist of Daniel Silva's thriller and espionage novel series

- First appearance: The Kill Artist
- Created by: Daniel Silva

In-universe information
- Gender: Male
- Occupation: Spy
- Nationality: Israeli

Gabriel Allon is the main protagonist in Daniel Silva's thriller and espionage series that focuses on Israeli intelligence. The main characters refer to their employer as 'the Office', although it is not specified that it is Mossad (which is indeed known internally in the Israeli intelligence community as HaMisrad [עברית: המשרד], literally 'the Office').

Allon's career began in 1972 when he, Eli Lavon and several others were plucked from civilian life by Ari Shamron to participate in Mossad assassinations following the Munich massacre (operation Wrath of God), an act of vengeance to hunt down and eliminate those responsible for killing the Israeli athletes in Munich. Wrath of God is referenced in the books throughout the course of his life.

== Biography ==
Allon is portrayed as a sabra whose first language was German. He was raised Jewish, albeit in a secular home in the Jezreel Valley kibbutz of Ramat David and was not familiar with Shabbat candles until he saw them as an adult. That his parents, specifically his mother Irene, were Holocaust survivors (she was from the Charlottenburg district of Berlin) is a thread throughout the series. His mother's unwillingness to discuss her Holocaust experiences is often alluded to, and that it is a critical part of what makes Allon such a natural spy and master of secrets. Beyond his being a Holocaust survivor, not much is known of Allon's father aside from his name being Greenberg, and that he was a Munich-born intellectual who was later killed in the Six-Day War. It is mentioned that Allon remembers him as a gentle, kind father who never struck him, except on the one occasion when Gabriel continually pressed him to talk about his experiences in the Holocaust.

According to Shamron, Gabriel's name was chosen for a reason: "Your mother named you Gabriel for a reason. Michael is the highest [angel], but you, Gabriel, are the mightiest. You're the one who defends Israel against its accusers. You're the angel of judgment – the Prince of Fire."

Several books in the series make reference to Allon's linguistic versatility, and it is confirmed that he speaks fluent English, French, German, Hebrew, and Italian as well passable Arabic and Spanish. In Prince of Fire, Silva lets the readers know that German, which Allon speaks with the Berlin accent of his mother, is his first language and remains the language of his dreams. According to press for The English Girl, Allon is in his 60s.

Allon's maternal grandfather, the fictional Viktor Frankel, was a well-known Berlin-based German Expressionist painter who is said to have been a disciple of the real-life Max Beckmann and who passed his talents on to his daughter (Gabriel's mother) before he was killed at Auschwitz in January 1943. She, in turn, passed these talents to Gabriel.

Allon served in an elite infantry unit and chose to enroll at the Bezalel Academy of Art and Design after completing his conscription service instead of extending his IDF service to accept a post in a special forces unit. In Moscow Rules, Allon states under interrogation in Lubyanka by the FSB that he fought in the Yom Kippur War and 1982 Lebanon War.

At Bezalel in Jerusalem in 1972, Shamron approached Allon to recruit him to join "the Office", Israel's foreign intelligence service, in order to take part in the retribution operation being carried out by Israel against the Black September terrorists in retaliation for perpetrating the Munich massacre at the 1972 Summer Olympics. Gabriel was one of the primary assassins in the operation conducted across Europe, which lasted three years and resulted in the derailment of Gabriel's then-likely future career as a painter.

In the aftermath of the Wrath of God operation, the Office sent Gabriel to Venice in 1974–75 to study art restoration under the cover identity of Italian art restorer Mario Delvecchio. Following completion of his apprenticeship there, he established himself as an art restorer for London-based art dealer Julian Isherwood's firm Isherwood Fine Arts. In reality, Allon was working full-time for the Office as an operations officer and assassin across Europe and North Africa until January 1991, when Allon's car was bombed while he was on assignment in Vienna, resulting in the death of his son and permanent disabling of his wife, Leah.

Devastated from the loss of a child and maiming of his wife, Allon resigned from the Office and moved to Cornwall to work full-time as an art restorer to pay for Leah's hospital bills at the psychiatric hospital nearby where she was living. However, after a nearly a decade living as a recluse on Lizard Peninsula, he was convinced by Shamron to return to the Office while simultaneously continuing to work as Delvecchio the art restorer in England and Italy as his primary unofficial cover, which also continues to play a large role in Allon's life.

Allon felt he had to make peace with Leah's situation before he could propose to, or marry, Chiara, the Italian-born Office field operative who later becomes his second wife. His son's ghost frequently haunts Allon, especially after Chiara's miscarriage following her kidnapping and their ensuing inability to conceive. After several years, Chiara gets pregnant again and delivers twins–a girl Irene, named in memory of Gabriel’s mother, and a boy, Raphael.

After more than a decade of resisting Shamron's efforts to force him to accept the position, Gabriel eventually succumbs to his advances and agrees to become the Office's director general, on the condition that Uzi Navot, Gabriel's immediate predecessor, is retained as deputy director general, with Navot keeping his full compensation package and benefits, which are normally only entitled to the director general.

Real-life spies that may have inspired some elements of Allon's fictional biography include Peter Malkin and Mike Harari.

== Real-world impact ==
The books are never explicit in the year in which they're set, but the passage of time roughly matches up to the books' annual releases. However some titles, for example Moscow Rules (2008) and The Defector (2009), take place within greater proximity to one another based on the books' events; the beginning of Portrait of a Spy (2011) actually recaps the last section of The Rembrandt Affair (2010).

There are many references to real-world events which affect Middle Eastern politics, such as the changing American presidencies, 9/11, the Iraq War, the 2006 Lebanon War, the death of Osama bin-Laden, the Arab Spring, the rise of ISIS, the Brexit referendum, Russia's 2022 invasion of Ukraine, and so on.

While names are changed in the book, the fallout from the assassination of journalist Jamal Khashoggi in the Saudi Arabian consulate in Istanbul is key to the plot of The New Girl.

On the other hand, in The Confessor (2003) Silva invents a fictional Pope Paul VII, a progressive leader who establishes a relationship with Allon in a sort of parallel universe which endures through many books (e.g. in The Fallen Angel (2012) Paul VII has been pope for fourteen years). Additionally, terrorists attack the Gare de Lyon (Prince of Fire, 2005) and St. Peter's Basilica (The Messenger, 2006), damaging these monuments in the world of the novels although they remain intact in the real world.

In an interview that coincided with the release of Moscow Rules, Silva revealed he heard an art professional quote Allon and some real-world news accounts make reference to the Allon series and wonder whether the specific news will become part of the series.

== Main characters ==
=== Gabriel's team ===
Allon's team is known by the code name Barak, the Hebrew word for lightning. and most of his team plays a role throughout the novels in the series. Some of them include:

Ari Shamron — former head of the Office. A Polish-born Jew from Lviv, his parents sent him to Israel as a teenager before the war; consequently he was the only member from his entire extended family to survive the Holocaust. Shamron is a father figure and mentor to Gabriel and the person who recruited him into the Office with the three-year Wrath of God operation. To Allon and his team, he's known as the Memuneh (Hebrew for 'the one in charge'). He is officially retired as the head of the Office, but it still remains his private fiefdom; he groomed and raised an entire generation of its officers, many of whom comprise much of the service's current senior management and executive staff. Eventually after the departure of two of his successors, he makes Uzi Navot the director general of the Office after finally giving up trying to perpetually force Gabriel to take the job (who repeatedly refused to accept the position). He is known throughout the Israeli intelligence community as the Old Man, being one of the last remaining members of the generation of spymasters who founded the state back in 1948 and as a result whose advice and counsel is still sought out regularly by the highest ranking leaders of the current Israeli defense and security establishment. While his age isn't explicitly referenced (or consistent through the series) his aging and health is of concern to Allon and his team; it is mentioned many times that he is also an incessant chain-smoker of sixty filthy, vile-smelling Turkish cigarettes daily. Gilah, Ari's long suffering wife, frequently plays a role as a mother figure to Gabriel and his team. Shamron's niece Rimona Stern is a key figure in Gabriel's team. While Shamron's character is clearly based in history (he is known to Gabriel and his team [as well as most Israelis] as the man who apprehended Adolf Eichmann in Buenos Aires) his real-world character is never identified in the novels. However, in an interview, Silva said that Shamron is a composite of several historical figures including Isser Harel, head of Mossad when Eichmann was apprehended. Following this connection, Harel wanted to meet Silva, but they were not able to establish a meeting before Harel died.

Chiara Allon (née Zolli) — Gabriel's second and current wife, now retired Office agent whom he meets in The Confessor. She is the extraordinarily intelligent and gorgeous daughter of Venice's chief rabbi. After what happened to his first wife, Leah, and son, Dani, he wasn't sure he could ever allow himself fall in love with another woman, and it took several years (and the light but unending pressure and reminding of Shamron and Gilah) for him to be willing to marry Chiara. When they first meet at her father's office in Venice during the course of his investigation into a Brenzone abbey (in the third book), he does not realize Chiara is a member of the Office, later having been assigned to follow him while he was in Rome. When he escapes while under fire (and wounded) from the Carabinieri who have been sent to apprehend him at a hotel in Rome (albeit on a false tip), she saves his life when he is cornered in an alleyway by an assassin in pursuit, appearing at the last moment on a motorcycle, taking him to an Office safehouse where she bandages his wounds and sits awake at his bedside with a pistol in her lap through the night, standing guard over him while he sleeps. She holds a master's degree in history from the University of Padua. Her education and ongoing interest in art, together with her background and history of growing up in the Jewish ghetto in Venice, complement Allon's art restoration work.

Uzi Navot – a senior Mossad case officer, recruiting and managing human intelligences sources and assets, primarily in Europe. First appears early in the series as the Office's chief of station in Paris, steadily advancing to assume responsibility for supervision for all western European case officers, later director of special operations and as Office director general. Brash, with a dry wit and roguish charm, he is widely respected both in Israel and by his foreign counterparts as an exceptionally competent field officer and successful director general, but lacking Gabriel's legendary accomplishments, nerve and aura. Early in the series he admits to harboring some professional jealousy towards Gabriel, saying "I've spent my entire career in your (Gabriel's) shadow." He eventually is replaced by Gabriel as director general, who convinces Navot to remain and work under him as his co-director general, with Gabriel running the field operations with Navot's full knowledge and input but allowing Navot free-rein to run most of the Office's day-to-day management and organizational affairs. Like Gabriel, he is the son of Holocaust survivors (albeit several years younger and from a long lineage of not Berliners but rather Viennese Jews). Also very linguistically versatile; known to be fluent in English, French, German and Hebrew, as well as speaking passable Arabic and Spanish. Although not an expert like Gabriel and Mikhail (or always in the best of shape physically), as a katsa Uzi has extensive combat and firearms training. He eventually marries Bella, his longtime on-and-off lover, who is a university professor in Israel. Uzi's appetite and fluctuating weight is regularly mentioned as a problem for him, as well as Bella's unremitting monitoring and occasional verbal scolding of him for it, much to the amusement of other characters. Gabriel considers him the closest thing he has to a brother (alongside Eli Lavon), and after his wife Chiara and Ari Shamron, is probably the series' most prominent secondary protagonist.

Eli Lavon — a former Office Neviot (the Office's surveillance division) officer who is now a professor of biblical archaeology at Hebrew University in Jerusalem. The wispy haired professor is usually on an excavation when Gabriel recruits him to take part in another job. Their history together dates back to Gabriel Allon's first mission, Operation Wrath of God, for which Lavon was an ayin, a tracker and surveillance specialist. He is known as the finest street surveillance operative that the Office has ever produced; no recruit graduates from the Office training academy without spending a few days studying at the feet of Eli Lavon. After the Wrath of God operation he resigned from the Office and moved to Vienna, where until the bombing at the beginning of the 4th novel, he was the director of a very successful Holocaust restitution research and investigative agency named the Bureau of Wartime Claims and Inquiries. Lavon is shown to speak fluent English, German, Hebrew and Russian, as well as passable French. It is stated that Lavon is several years older than Gabriel and that he has known Gabriel longer and better than anyone else among the supporting cast, except Ari Shamron. Upon becoming director general, Gabriel appoints him as the chief of Neviot, the Office's electronic and physical surveillance division.

Mikhail Abramov — Moscow-born former special forces officer currently on loan to the Office from the IDF's elite Sayeret Matkal special operations unit. Has been described as Gabriel without a conscience, having dismantled a large portion of the upper echelons of Hamas and Islamic Jihad "practically by himself". As the member of the team with the most advanced combat/special forces training (armed, hand to hand, and otherwise) aside from Gabriel, Mikhail usually acts as Gabriel's motorcycle driver on drive-by hits (or vice versa), as well as his primary partner while executing targets on foot. Was romantically linked to Sarah Bancroft. Eventually falls in love with and marries Natalie Mizrahi.

Yaakov Rossman — an longtime case officer in Shabak's Arab Affairs department, running agents and sources inside the West Bank and Gaza. Speaks fluent Arabic, English, Hebrew and German. Known as one of Shabak's most skilled interrogators. Dark-haired with pockmarked cheeks, he plays a prominent role in most of Gabriel's field operations, usually present while conducting surveillance, armed assaults as well as kidnappings. Occasionally acts as Gabriel's driver. Is later appointed by Gabriel to become chief of the Office's special operations division.

Yossi Gavish – a senior officer in the Office's Research division, often doubling as a field operative supporting Gabriel in the field, posing with Rimona Stern as a couple. Born and raised in London, Gavish read classics at All Souls College at Oxford, speaks four languages, including Hebrew with a pronounced British accent. As the member of Gabriel's team with the most comprehensive intellectual education, Gavish often serves as a primary briefer for Gabriel and his team. Tweedy, witty, and still somewhat more British than Israeli in personality, he is known to have his tea specially shipped to Israel from New Bond Street in London on a regular basis. Upon becoming director general, Gabriel appoints him to be chief of the Research division.

Dina Sarid — an Office Research division analyst. Known as one of the sharpest minds and investigators on Gabriel's team, she is driven by an attack by a suicide bomber that injured her and killed her mother and two sisters. She still walks with a limp. Her encyclopedic knowledge of names, faces and dates of terrorist attacks is second to none. She is part of the assorted group that comprises Gabriel's Barak team, which assembles on short notice in response to occurrences of terrorist attacks and operations. Is later appointed to deputy chief of the Office's Research division.

Rimona Stern — Shamron's niece who Allon has known since she was a child. A major in the IDF's military intelligence directorate, in later books it is stated that she is assigned to Israel's joint task force, which deals with Iran's increasing imminent nuclear ambitions. Is appointed as Gabriel's successor as Office director general.

Natalie Mizrahi – an Office field operative. First appearing in The Black Widow. A Marseilles-born physician born to Algerian Jewish parents. After the Arab Spring begins she moves to Israel with her family. Fluent in Arabic, French, English, and Hebrew, she is working as an emergency room surgeon at Jerusalem's Hadassah Ein Kerem hospital when she is recruited from civilian life by Uzi Navot to serve as an undercover operative on a joint US-UK-French-Israeli operation against ISIS. Afterwards Gabriel offers her a full-time position at the Office, which she accepts. Becomes romantically involved with Mikhail, eventually marrying him.

Shimon Pazner – Negev-born Office chief of station in Rome (which doubles as headquarters for Office operations throughout the Mediterranean). Usually interacts or meets with Gabriel during operations in Italy. Gabriel's requesting and Pazner's granting of unwarranted favors and Gabriel's subsequent actions usually end up destroying Pazner's goodwill towards him and often nearly his career in the process.

Oded — German-speaking agent often used by Gabriel as an all-purpose operative who specializes in the direct (and often lethal) action portions of Gabriel's operations (kidnappings, interrogations, mobile hit-and-runs, etc.) Usually brought in by Gabriel with Mordecai.

Mordecai — usually brought in by Gabriel with Oded. The primary tech specialist and troubleshooter within Gabriel's team, specializing in vehicular surveillance, communications, and electronics equipment/devices.

=== Other recurring characters ===
Leah Allon (née Savir) — Gabriel's first wife, an exceptionally talented artist, she was severely wounded and left with permanent burns inflicted during the Vienna car bomb attack in January 1991 that killed their son, Dani. The bombing left her with permanent physical and mental impairment (the bombing is told in the prologue of the series' first installment The Kill Artist). Other than for brief instances of lucidity, a combination of severe post-traumatic stress and depression has left her incapacitated with her mind permanently replaying the events leading up to the Vienna bombing. She had been originally placed in a psychiatric hospital in England, but after she was kidnapped, Gabriel moved her to an Israeli psychiatric hospital near Mount Herzl in Jerusalem.

Julian Isherwood — born Isakowitz, the son of a Jewish Parisian art dealer, he was smuggled out of France before the Nazis killed his father. He is owner of Isherwood Fine Arts, a London-based art gallery specializing in Old Masters. Was recruited as a sayan by Shamron in the mid-1970s for one very specific purpose: to facilitate and maintain the identity of Mario Delvecchio, a Cornwall-based Italian expatriate art restorer of Old Masters paintings; in reality the operational cover of Office assassin Gabriel Allon.

Adrian Carter – longtime CIA director of operations, later director of clandestine services and finally CIA director. Known to be a polyglot. Has a decades-long working relationship with Shamron (known to be several years older than Carter) as well as a strong professional and personal relationship with Seymour. His service (the CIA) generally ends up footing the bill of all of the Anglo-Israeli joint operations and is responsible for the documentation (passports, visas, etc.), as well as handling logistical relations and harnessing political support from other countries (and their corresponding security and intelligence services) usually wary of being involved in joint operations with the Israeli intelligence services. In the later books when Morris Payne becomes CIA director, Carter's profile in the series is temporarily lowered, but he becomes prominent again in The Collector after Payne's departure and his long-deserved appointment as CIA director.

Graham Seymour — the Oxbridge-educated deputy director general of MI5 (later MI6 director general), known to be several years older than Gabriel. Shown to be a very strict by-the-book officer in regards to operational parameters (often legally-speaking) and very much attuned to internal British politics in regards to MI5/MI6. Often very hesitant and wary to grant Gabriel permission to operate on British soil and very quick to reprimand Gabriel's actions and distance himself if their joint operations go awry. Over the course of the series, he begins to see Gabriel and the Israelis in a much more forgiving light, to the point where in the later books he considered Gabriel to be a good and trusted friend, especially after The English Spy, when he becomes the director general of MI6. After British Prime Minister Jonathan Lancaster's mistress Madeline Hart is kidnapped and vanishes, he turns to Seymour for help, who entrusts Gabriel with the task of investigating. After Gabriel is successful in unearthing the kidnapping plot, the Russian government's involvement, and locating and rescuing Madeline Hart and returning her to London, his esteem for Gabriel increases significantly. He plays a significant role in nearly every book's plotline in the series, from The Messenger on forward.

Sarah Bancroft — a former CIA officer who worked with Gabriel and his Office team on several assignments. The daughter of a wealthy Citibank executive, she spent most of her early years being educated at the finest boarding schools throughout western Europe, returning to the States to attend university. Holds a bachelor's in art history from Dartmouth; and studied at the Courtauld Institute of Art in London before receiving a Ph.D from Harvard, where she was the author of a highly acclaimed doctoral dissertation on the German Expressionists. In the aftermath of the 9/11 attacks (in which her fiancée was killed) she applied to the CIA, but was not accepted. When Carter arranges for Gabriel to meet her during The Messenger as a prospective candidate for an assignment in a joint US-Israeli deep cover operation, she was working as a curator at the Phillips Collection in Washington. Later in the series, after working with him on an operation, she dated Mikhail for a significant period (much to Gabriel's consternation). Later she marries Christopher Keller.

Christopher Keller — a MI6 field officer. The London-born son of Harley Street physicians, Keller dropped out Cambridge to enlist in the British Army against the wishes of his parents and was accepted into the Special Air Service, becoming known as one of its most talented and accomplished operators, assigned to the Sabre squadron, specializing in desert warfare and eventually becoming an officer. He served undercover in Northern Ireland in the mid-1980s, until he was caught by the IRA and tortured, though eventually managed to escape and kill all of his captors in the process. In 1991, he was deployed to Iraq with his SAS squadron, and was mistakenly thought to have been killed as a result of a tragic friendly fire incident. He survived, and managed to make his way to Corsica, where Don Anton Orsati, head of the Orsati crime family, took him into his employ as one of his professional assassins, becoming his most valuable employee. He was the antagonist in The English Assassin but returned in The English Girl, The Heist and The English Spy to work with Gabriel and his team. After Graham Seymour confronts Gabriel about his renewed professional liaison with Keller at the beginning of The English Spy, he makes Keller an offer: repatriation and a full pardon of all his crimes while working as a professional assassin, on the condition that he returns to the UK and joins MI6 full-time, to which Keller agrees. At the end of The New Girl, Keller is romantically linked to Sarah Bancroft, later marrying her. Keller and Mikhail Abramov form a remarkably effective and lethal duo together; both special forces officers by training and assassins by profession (Keller under the cover of a Orsati Olive Oil company employee and Mikhail working for the Office's Kidon unit), they are often seen side-by-side, working together under Gabriel and Seymour's direction.

Paul Rousseau — director of the Alpha Group, a fictional division of the DGSI, France's internal security service. First appearing in The Black Widow after the Paris bombing which kills Hannah Weinberg, Rousseau's division specializes in combatting domestic terrorism and organized crime using human intelligence sources, with a particular focus on Islamic fundamentalism and terror within France and its former colonies. A widower, he is said to be a former literary scholar and one of France's foremost authorities on the works of Proust. The success of their joint operations against ISIS in The Black Widow and House of Spies is said in the later books to have all but eliminated the decades-long mistrust and suspicion within the French security establishment towards Israel.

Christoph Bittel — a senior Swiss intelligence officer. First appearing in The Fallen Angel as the head of the counterterrorist division of the DAP (later known as the NDB, Switzerland's small but capable security and intelligence service) later becoming its chief of domestic operations. As Gabriel's interrogator after he is arrested in the aftermath of the bombing at a St. Moritz art gallery, he brokers a deal with Gabriel to rehabilitate Swiss-Israeli intelligence relations whereby Gabriel provides him with a thorough account of all his numerous past activities on Swiss soil (assassinations, kidnappings, recruitments of Swiss businessmen, abduction of Russian nationals), and in exchange he provides Gabriel with a retroactive pardon for all crimes committed. Afterwards, Bittel warily enters into a professional relationship with Gabriel where he often provides him with off-the-books operational support and domestic intelligence of interest to the Office, in exchange for being notified whenever Gabriel enters Switzerland or targets Swiss nationals or assets. Over time, much of Bittel's distrust towards Gabriel gradually dissipates, and their relationship, though certainly not worthy of being described as warm or collegial like Gabriel's relations with Seymour or Carter, becomes businesslike and fairly amicable, with Bittel remaining circumspect of every interaction with Gabriel but appreciating the Office's usefulness as a force multiplier in addressing Switzerland's growing national security needs while constrained by the NDB's limited international presence and resources.

== Titles ==
1. The Kill Artist (2000)
2. The English Assassin (2002)
3. The Confessor (2003)
4. A Death in Vienna (2004)
5. Prince of Fire (2005)
6. The Messenger (2006)
7. The Secret Servant (2007)
8. Moscow Rules (2008)
9. The Defector (2009)
10. The Rembrandt Affair (2010)
11. Portrait of a Spy (2011)
12. The Fallen Angel (2012)
13. The English Girl (2013)
14. The Heist (2014)
15. The English Spy (2015)
16. The Black Widow (2016)
17. House of Spies (2017)
18. The Other Woman (2018)
19. The New Girl (2019)
20. The Order (2020)
21. The Cellist (2021)
22. Portrait of an Unknown Woman (2022)
23. The Collector (2023)
24. A Death in Cornwall (2024)
25. An Inside Job (2025)
26. Ransom (2026)
