= The Fallen Angel (novel) =

2012 spy novel by Daniel Silva

- The Fallen Angel
- Author: Daniel Silva
- Language: English
- Series: Gabriel Allon series
- Genre: Spy fiction, crime, mystery, thriller
- Publisher: Harper (US)
- Publication date: 2012
- Publication place: United States
- Media type: Print
- Pages: 405 (1st edition)
- ISBN: 9780062073129 (US)
- Preceded by: Portrait of a Spy
- Followed by: The English Girl

The Fallen Angel is a 2012 spy novel by Daniel Silva. It is the twelfth in the Gabriel Allon series.

== Plot ==
"This book runs along the Jerusalem-to-Rome historical axis. It goes sort of backward in time from Rome to Jerusalem," said Silva. The first part of the book is set in Italy as Allon helps the Pope's private secretary, Monsignor Luigi Donati, with a case that is troubling The Vatican. Silva includes episodes exploring the traffic in looted antiquities and the history and meaning of the Temple Mount to all three Abrahamic religions.

== Reception ==
The book was longlisted for the 2013 IMPAC award, and like others in Silva's Allon series, The Fallen Angel was a New York Times bestseller, rising to #1 on the hardcover fiction list in August 2012. Zarine Khan was considered for Chimera, a planned movie adaptation of the book, but this did not proceed.
