= Portrait of an Unknown Woman (novel) =

2022 novel by Daniel Silva

First edition (publ. HarperCollins)

Portrait of an Unknown Woman is the twenty second novel by Daniel Silva. It was released on July 19, 2022, and as with others in Silva's Allon series is a New York Times bestseller.

Gabriel Allon is retired from The Office and has returned to his roots as an art restorer while living in Venice with his wife and children when he gets a call about a mysterious art forger.
