= Jamie Gangel =

American journalist (born 1955)

- Born: November 2, 1955 (age 70); New York City, New York, U.S.
- Education: Georgetown University (BS)
- Occupation: Television reporter
- Spouse: Daniel Silva (m. 1988)
- Children: 2

Jamie Sue Gangel (born November 2, 1955) is an American television news reporter working as a CNN special correspondent. She joined NBC News in 1983 as a general assignment and political correspondent based in Washington, DC, and was a frequent contributor to NBC Nightly News, Today, Dateline NBC and MSNBC. She became a national correspondent for the NBC News' Today show in February 1992.

== Early life and education ==
Gangel was born and raised in New York City, the daughter of Richard I. Gangel and Phyllis Gangel-Jacob. Her parents divorced eleven months after her birth. Her mother is a retired justice of the New York Supreme Court. Gangel was raised Jewish. Gangel earned a Bachelor of Science degree from Georgetown University's Edmund A. Walsh School of Foreign Service in 1977. She attended Harvard University in 1976, where she studied international economics.

== Career ==
Gangel began her career in broadcast journalism in 1978 as an assignment editor for WJLA-TV in Washington. At the same time, she worked for all-news radio station WTOP-AM, the CBS affiliate in Washington. In 1982, she joined television station WPLG-TV in Miami as a general assignment reporter and substitute anchor.

Gangel broadcast some of the first reports of the September 11, 2001, attacks from New York, including confirming that the Pentagon had been hit by a plane and that the CIA offices had been evacuated. Her exclusive interviews have included Frank Zappa and former Presidents Gerald Ford, Jimmy Carter, George H. W. Bush, Bill Clinton and George W. Bush.

On August 24, 2015, Gangel began a new phase of her career as a Special Correspondent for CNN.

== Personal life ==
Gangel is married to New York Times bestselling author Daniel Silva and they have two children, twins Lily and Nicholas. The family resides in Florida. Silva converted to Judaism as an adult.

== Awards ==
Gangel has won numerous awards for reporting, including the

- Edward R. Murrow Award, presented by the Radio-Television News Directors Association;
- Gracie Award, by the American Women in Radio and Television;
- Clarion Award, and the
- Associated Press Award for Best Spot News Coverage.
