= A Death in Cornwall =

2024 novel by Daniel Silva

A Death in Cornwall is the 2024 title and 24th in the series from Daniel Silva wherein Gabriel Allon is searching for a stolen Picasso work. The book reached #1 on the New York Times bestseller list the week after its release.
