= The Cellist (novel) =

2021 novel by Daniel Silva

First edition (publ. HarperCollins)

The Cellist is the twenty first title in Daniel Silva's Gabriel Allon series. It was released on July 13, 2021 and subsequently reached No. 1 on the New York Times Bestseller List and No. 4 on that of the Los Angeles Times. The book draws heavily from the COVID-19 pandemic and the 2020 American presidential election as well as the U.S. Capitol events of January 6, 2021. In addition to Allon and his stable of Israeli intelligence agents, The Cellist also features previous characters including Sarah Bancroft and Christopher Keller in Allon's quest to get retribution against Russia.
