= The Kill Artist =

2000 novel by Daniel Silva

- First edition (US)
- Author: Daniel Silva
- Language: English
- Series: Gabriel Allon series
- Genre: Spy fiction Thriller
- Publisher: Random House (US); Orion Publishing Group (UK)
- Publication date: 2000 (US); 20 June 2002 (UK)
- Publication place: United States United Kingdom
- Media type: Print (hardback and paperback)
- Pages: 428 (1st edition) (US); 480 (UK)
- ISBN: 0375500901 (US); 978-0-7528-4785-6 (UK)
- Preceded by: The Marching Season
- Followed by: The English Assassin

The Kill Artist is a 2000 spy novel by American author Daniel Silva. It is the first book featuring Gabriel Allon. It was released in the UK on 20 June 2002.

== Plot summary ==
Israel's prime minister reinstates Ari Shamron as Mossad director. Shortly thereafter, Israel's ambassador is murdered in Paris. The crime has all of the markings of Tariq al-Hourani, a terrorist mastermind.

Gabriel spearheaded a team that located and killed the operatives in the "Munich Massacre." Seventeen years later, Tariq took vengeance upon Gabriel—family member for family member—by planting a bomb under the Allons' car in Vienna. Gabriel witnessed his family's horrifying destruction. His son Dani died instantly, while his wife Leah was left with a shattered mind and body.

Nine years later, Gabriel has cut ties with the Office, secreted himself in Southern England, and poured himself into his other profession as an art restorer. Ari Shamron shows up on his doorstep. Shamron explains that he wants to assassinate Tariq but lacks support from the departmental directors at the Office. As a result, he urges Gabriel to spearhead a secret assassination operation. He accepts Shamron's plan and begins surveillance of Yusef, a member of Tariq's closely knit organization.

Gabriel decides that he needs to set Yusef up with a female operative. He handpicks Jacqueline Delacroix (née Sarah Halévy), a French supermodel. Jacqueline has previously assisted three Office operations; in one of these, she worked closely with Gabriel and the two had an affair. Gabriel is careful to keep his interactions with Jacqueline to a mere professional familiarity. Jacqueline discovers that Gabriel still grieves over their affair, for its unmasking made Leah decide to accompany Gabriel on the fateful operation to Vienna.

Realizing that her modeling career is declining and unfulfilling, Jacqueline accepts Gabriel's role for her and seduces Yusef. Although this allows Gabriel to bug Yusef's apartment, it likewise blows Jacqueline's cover, for Yusef finds her making imprints of his keys and later sees Gabriel in his building. Gabriel is very concerned with Jacqueline's safety and therefore tries to pull her from the operation. Shamron, however, insists that her identity as Dominique Bonard is secure and insists that Gabriel continue the plan.

Meanwhile, Yusef warns Tariq that Gabriel is searching for him. Tariq designs a plan where Jacqueline must prove her professed love for Yusef by accompanying Tariq on a supposedly diplomatic mission to the United States. Indeed, Tariq recognizes Jacqueline from previous Office operations and suspects that he can use her as bait to lure Gabriel to his death. A conspiratorial relationship between Yusef and Uzi Navot, a major agent for the Office in Europe, also becomes apparent. Navot is one of the few Office operatives who knows about Shamron's secret plot.

Shortly after Jacqueline begins this 'diplomatic' trip, she realizes that her identity and security have been compromised. Gabriel believes that he has the upper hand in the arrangement until Tariq consistently eludes him and then disappears. Tariq smuggles Jacqueline through Québec and into New York City, where he intends to make his last stand. The new PM of Israel and Yasser Arafat are in NYC that weekend to celebrate a momentous step towards creating peace between the Israelis and Palestinians. Too late, Gabriel realizes that Tariq's target is Arafat and not Israel's PM; Gabriel hastily alerts Arafat by phone just as the disguised Tariq zones in on the kill. Arafat the diplomat calmly recounts his love for Tariq, a former associate, and urges the assassin to abandon his design. Tariq decides to let Arafat live just as Gabriel and the escaped Jacqueline arrive on the scene. Tariq shoots Gabriel in the chest, but Jacqueline pursues and kills the would-be assassin.

Gabriel recovers from his wound in Israel, where Jacqueline has been forced to relocate due to media coverage of the event. One day, Gabriel spots Yusef in a local market and questions him at gunpoint. Yusef admits that he was working for Shamron as a double agent, and that Shamron had concocted the whole plot so Gabriel could finish off Tariq. When an angry Gabriel confronts Shamron, the wizened director is unapologetic and insists that it was both necessary to kill Tariq and just to have the killer be Gabriel.

Once his recovery is complete, Gabriel returns to his life in southern England as an art restorer.

== Critical reception ==
Rebecca Ascher-Walsh, writing for Entertainment Weekly, gave the novel a "B+," describing it as "pure political popcorn." According to Amazon.com, The New Yorker says that Silva "may never get around to plumbing his characters' souls, but he's having such a good time that we're content just to watch him play." Randy Signor was less flattering and lamented that Silva's "promising career has now veered toward the predictable and slightly silly."

== International titles ==
- Portuguese: O Artista da Morte. (The Artist of Death). (2008). ISBN 9789722516761 OCLC 426396592
- German: Der Auftraggeber. (The Client). (2003). ISBN 978-3-492-23887-8
