= Prince of Fire =

2005 spy novel by Daniel Silva

- Prince of Fire
- Author: Daniel Silva
- Language: English
- Series: Gabriel Allon series
- Genre: Spy fiction, crime, mystery, thriller
- Publisher: G. P. Putnam's Sons (US)
- Publication date: 2005
- Publication place: United States
- Media type: Print
- Pages: 369
- ISBN: 978-0-399-15243-6 (US)
- Preceded by: A Death in Vienna
- Followed by: The Messenger

Prince of Fire is a 2005 spy novel by Daniel Silva. It spent four weeks as a New York Times bestseller.

== Plot summary ==
After terrorists bomb the Israeli embassy in Rome, agents at Israel's intelligence service —better known as the Office— struggle to determine a precise motive for the attack. The investigation uncovers a CD filled with highly sensitive information about Gabriel Allon, a legendary hit man for the Office. No longer safe outside of Israel, Gabriel returns reluctantly to his homeland with Italian girlfriend and fellow Office agent Chiara Zolli.

Lev, the current director of the Office, has long resented Gabriel's close ties to Ari Shamron, former director of the Office, as well as his recent clandestine work for Shamron. Lev demands that Gabriel officially rejoin the Office so he can benefit from the protection of other agents. However, Gabriel and Shamron also recognize that Lev seeks to control and curtail their secret operations.

Lev instructs Gabriel to remain in Israel and assigns him a research team to investigate the bombing and its link to Gabriel. Thus, Yossi, Dina, Yaakov, and Rimona come under Gabriel's direction. Dina connects a series of seemingly random terrorist attacks and attributes them to Khaled al-Khalifa, a mysterious descendant of Palestinian warlords. Indeed, Dina points out, Shamron and Gabriel each led operations against Khaled's relatives. Though adopted by Yasser Arafat as a child, Khaled grew up abroad and never became a visible force within the PLO. Dina proposes that, hidden behind a carefully constructed European identity, Khaled has masterminded brutal attacks against Israel, including the recent embassy bombing. In fact, all of the attacks seem to commemorate the murders of Palestinians, including Khaled's father and organizer of Black September, Sabri al-Khalifa. Dina suggests that another attack is imminent: she anticipates an act of terror to commemorate the Israeli razing of Beit Sayeed, the hometown of Khaled's Palestinian ancestors. Only twenty-eight days remain until the fiftieth anniversary of that event.

The reader learns that Khaled lives as a prosperous and renowned French archeologist under the identity of Paul Martineau. He organizes terror attacks through an Arab associate in Marseille. The reader also discovers that the arrangements for Khaled's next attack are underway.

As Gabriel and Chiara settle into a new life in Israel, Ari recommends that Gabriel dissolve his marriage to Leah and marry Chiara. He also presses Gabriel to meet with Yasser Arafat to learn of Khaled's whereabouts. Ari's son Yonatan, a member of the IDF, escorts Gabriel to the Mukataa, Arafat's compound. Although the Israeli and Palestinian traditionally work for opposing ideologies, Arafat consents to the meeting because Gabriel once saved his life. Gabriel sees through Arafat's evasive answers and lies and concludes that Khaled did indeed plan the bombing of the Israeli embassy. Gabriel also learns that Tariq al-Hourani worked for Arafat, and the car bomb that killed his son and maimed Leah was also meant to end his own life.

Yaakov later introduced Gabriel to Mahmoud Arwish, a reticent Palestinian informant. Arwish confirms that Khaled contacts Arafat regularly and uses a female collaborator to relay important phone messages. Because the most recent of such phone messages came from Cairo, Gabriel travels to Egypt. There, he meets Mimi Ferrere, a polyglot and social butterfly whose voice matches that of Khaled's collaborator. He bugs her phone, intercepts a message from Khaled, and matches the phone number to Marseille.

Aboard the ship Fidelity, Gabriel meets with his team and Ari Shamron to plan Khaled's murder. However, Khaled anticipates their attack and leads Gabriel into a trap: he must put himself into Khaled's hands or Leah will die; Gabriel abandons his team to save his wife. Khaled's instructions lead Gabriel to the Parisian Gare de Lyon, and Gabriel realizes too late that Khaled plans to bomb the train station and pin the crime on Gabriel and Israeli intelligence. With only seconds to spare, Gabriel kills two of Khaled's three bombers and rescues Leah.

They return safely to Israel, but Khaled and Mimi leak photographs of Gabriel to the press that link him to the bombing at Gare de Lyon. Although she still suffers psychiatric trauma, Leah regains a piece of herself and begins to communicate with Gabriel for the first time in thirteen years. Chiara decides to leave Gabriel and returns to Venice. Ultimately, Gabriel locates and kills Khaled at an archeological excavation in southern France. He then returns to Israel and art restoration.

== Historical application ==
Although Prince of Fire is fiction, Silva based some of its characters on real people, including Black September mastermind Ali Hassan Salameh, as well as Yasser Arafat, who did in reality adopt Salameh's son after Israeli agents killed Salameh. Yasser Arafat died before the completion of Prince of Fire.

== International titles ==
- Portuguese: Príncipe de Fogo. (Prince of Fire). (2006). ISBN 9722514652

== Sources ==
- Silva, Daniel. Prince of Fire. G.P. Putnam's Sons: 2005, 364 pages.
