= Daniel Silva (novelist) =

American writer

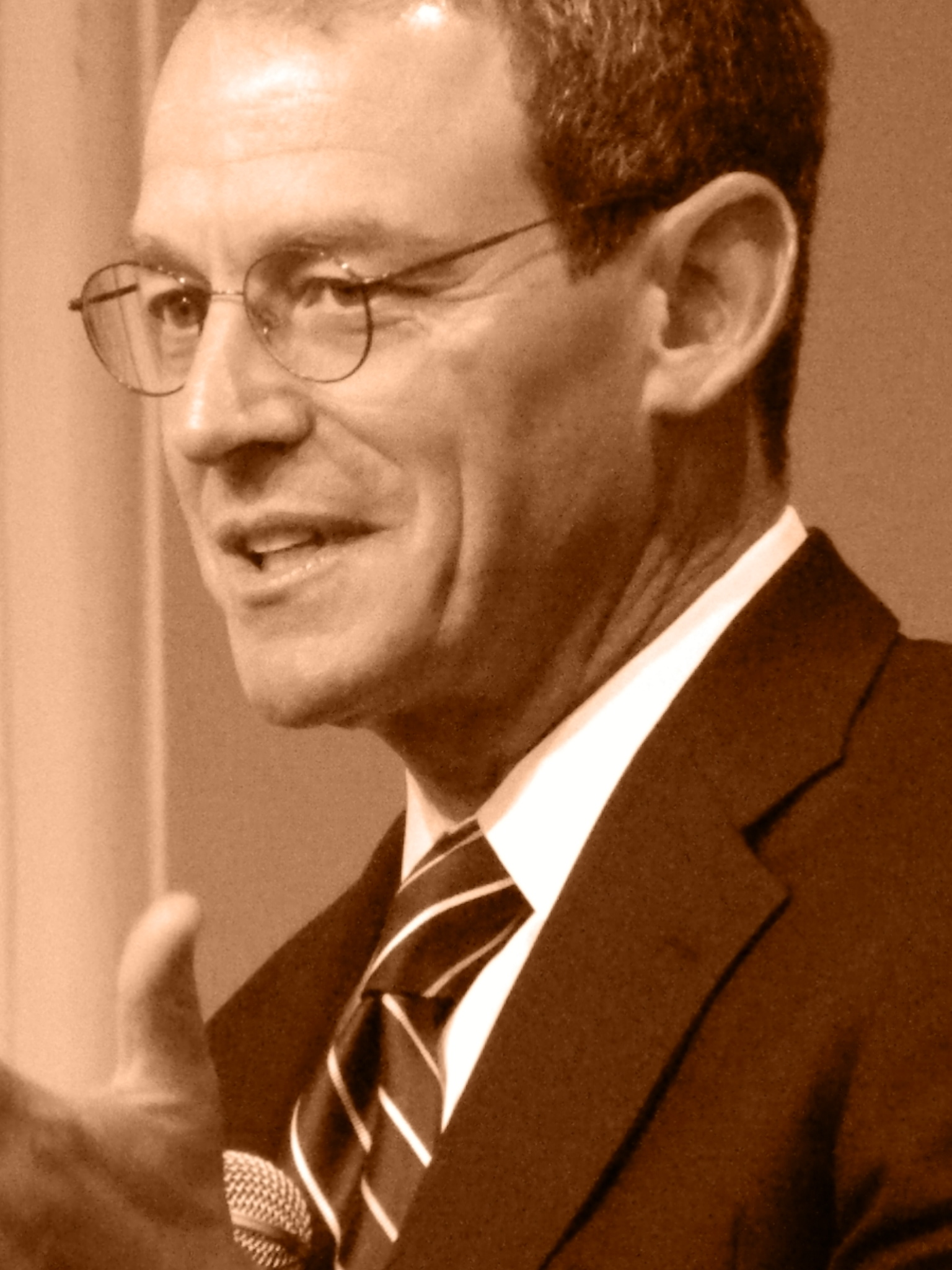
- Silva in 2013
- Born: 1960; Kalamazoo, Michigan, U.S.
- Education: California State University, Fresno (BA)
- Occupations: Novelist, journalist
- Spouse: Jamie Gangel (m. 1988)
- Children: 2
- Writing career
- Years active: 1984–present
- Period: 1996–present
- Genre: Spy fiction
- Notable awards: Barry Award; 2007 The Messenger; Barry Award; 2013 The Fallen Angel
- Website: www.danielsilvabooks.com

Daniel Silva (born 1960) is an American journalist and author of thriller and spy novels.

== Early life ==
Silva was born in 1960 in Kalamazoo, Michigan. When he was seven years old, his family moved to Merced, California. He was raised as a Catholic.

He received his Bachelor of Arts degree from California State University, Fresno. He began a graduate program in international relations at San Francisco State University but left when offered employment as a journalist at United Press International (UPI).

== Career ==
=== Journalist ===
Silva began his writing career as a journalist with a temporary position at UPI in 1984. His assignment was to cover the Democratic National Convention. UPI made Silva's position permanent and, a year later transferred him to the Washington, D.C. headquarters. After two more years, he was appointed as UPI's Middle East correspondent and moved to Cairo.

Silva returned to Washington, D.C., for a position with Cable News Network's Washington bureau. He worked as a producer and executive producer for several of CNN's television programs, including Crossfire and Capital Gang.

=== Novelist ===
In 1994, he began work on his first novel, The Unlikely Spy (1996). The novel debuted on The New York Times best-seller list on January 26, 1997; it remained on the list for five weeks, rising to number 13. In 1997, Silva left CNN to pursue writing full-time.

Since then, Silva has written 27 more spy novels, all best-sellers on The New York Times list. Gabriel Allon, an Israeli art restorer, spy and assassin, is the protagonist in all but three of Silva's titles. The series has been a New York Times bestseller since its first installment in 2001. Thirteen of the series' titles hit number one on The New York Times list of best sellers (bibliography below). Some of his novels involve Islamic terrorism, some involve Russian villains, and some are highly fanciful accounts about historic events related to World War II and the Holocaust. Silva did not come into the Allon series with a significant understanding of the world of art restoration but was able to use a neighbor's expertise to help him turn a spy-assassin into an artist.

== Adaptations ==
In 2007, Universal Pictures made an offer to option the rights to Silva's Gabriel Allon series, starting with The Messenger (2006). In 2011, it was announced that Jeff Zucker would serve as producer, though the deal was never signed. On May 15, 2017, MGM Television acquired the adaption rights for the Allon series, though no production schedule was released and it was not specified which novel or novels were under consideration.

== Personal life ==
Silva met Jamie Gangel, a CNN special correspondent while they were both correspondents in the Middle East. They later married, and Silva converted from Catholicism to Judaism, his wife's religion.

Silva and his wife have twins. Silva frequently takes his children on research trips for his books.

== Honors ==
- 2007 Barry Award for Best Thriller for The Messenger, 2013 Barry Award for Best Thriller for The Fallen Angel.
- In January 2009, Silva was appointed to the United States Holocaust Memorial Museum's United States Holocaust Memorial Council.

== Published works ==
Series	Nbr	Title	Year	ISBN	NYT Weeks^{[A]}	NYT Max^{[B]}	Note
None		The Unlikely Spy	1996	0679455620	5	13	
Michael Osbourne	1	The Mark of the Assassin	1998	0679455639	3	12	
Michael Osbourne	2	The Marching Season	1999	0375500898	5	17	
Gabriel Allon	1	The Kill Artist	2000	0375500901	1	12	
Gabriel Allon	2	The English Assassin	2002	0399148515	4	7	
Gabriel Allon	3	The Confessor	2003	0399149724	5	5	
Gabriel Allon	4	A Death in Vienna	2004	0399151435	5	5	Nominated for 2005 Barry Award for Best Thriller
Gabriel Allon	5	Prince of Fire	2005	0399152431	4	5	
Gabriel Allon	6	The Messenger	2006	978-0399153358	6	3	Winner of 2007 Barry Award for Best Thriller
Gabriel Allon	7	The Secret Servant	2007	978-0399154225	6	2	
Gabriel Allon	8	Moscow Rules	2008	978-0399155017	6	1	
Gabriel Allon	9	The Defector	2009	978-0399155680	4	1	
Gabriel Allon	10	The Rembrandt Affair	2010	978-0399156588	6	1	Nominated for 2011 Barry Award for Best Thriller
Gabriel Allon	11	Portrait of a Spy	2011	978-0062072184	6	2	
Gabriel Allon	12	The Fallen Angel	2012	978-0062073129	6	1	Winner of 2013 Barry Award for Best Thriller
Gabriel Allon	13	The English Girl	2013	978-0062073167	7	1	
Gabriel Allon	14	The Heist	2014	978-0062320056	6	1	
Gabriel Allon	15	The English Spy	2015	978-0062320056	7	1	
Gabriel Allon	16	The Black Widow	2016	978-0062320223	7	1	
Gabriel Allon	17	House of Spies	2017	978-0062354341	6	1	
Gabriel Allon	18	The Other Woman	2018	978-0062834829	5	1	
Gabriel Allon	19	The New Girl	2019	978-0062834836	5	1	
Gabriel Allon	20	The Order	2020	978-1460709764	6	1	
Gabriel Allon	21	The Cellist	2021	978-0063211988	5	1	
Gabriel Allon	22	Portrait of an Unknown Woman	2022	978-006-2834850	3	3	
Gabriel Allon	23	The Collector	2023	978-0062834874			
Gabriel Allon	24	A Death in Cornwall	2024	978-0062834874		1	
Gabriel Allon	25	An Inside Job	2025	978-0063384217			
Gabriel Allon	26	Ransom	2026				

^{A} Weeks on The New York Times best seller list

^{B} Highest level on The New York Times best seller list
