= The Defector (Silva novel) =

2009 spy novel by Daniel Silva

- The Defector
- Author: Daniel Silva
- Language: English
- Series: Gabriel Allon series
- Genre: Spy fiction, crime, mystery, thriller
- Publisher: G. P. Putnam's Sons (US)
- Publication date: 2009
- Publication place: United States
- Media type: Print
- Pages: 469
- ISBN: 9780399155680 (US)
- Preceded by: Moscow Rules
- Followed by: The Rembrandt Affair

The Defector is a 2009 spy novel by Daniel Silva. It spent four weeks as a New York Times bestseller, reaching the list's top spot. It is the 9th book in the Gabriel Allon series. Released July 21, 2009, the cover depicts the Houses of Parliament and Big Ben in London. The cover of the paperback printing by Signet (July 2010) depicts St. Basil's Cathedral in Moscow.

== Plot summary ==
Unusually for the Allon series, this novel is a sequel to the previous one (Moscow Rules), with many of the same characters, in particular the antagonist, Ivan Kharkov. The beginning finds Gabriel Allon and his new wife Chiara resuming the honeymoon in rural Umbria which was interrupted by the events of Moscow Rules; Gabriel is again restoring a painting for the Vatican, this time Guido Reni's "Crucifixion of St Peter." When Grigori Bulganov, the Russian defector who had saved Gabriel's life at the end of Moscow Rules, goes missing from his new home in London, Gabriel assumes he was kidnapped by Kharkov and begins to work to bring him back. Then Chiara herself is kidnapped, and Gabriel's resolve becomes more intense. To rescue her, he must call not only on his own Israeli team of specialists but on the highest levels of the American, British, and (thanks to a massive bribe) Russian governments. Although they are rescued, Gabriel and Chiara are traumatized.

Because of the personal element in his pursuit of his wife's kidnappers, Gabriel Allon kills an unusually high number of Russians, not only in the process of discovering her whereabouts and rescuing her, but also in methodically assassinating eleven ex-KGB operatives living in Europe who participated in the two abductions. This is set against the discovery of a mass grave of tens of thousands of Russian citizens slaughtered by Joseph Stalin in his Great Purge of 1937.

== International titles ==
- Portuguese: O Desertor. (The Defector). (2010). ISBN 9789722522182
- Hebrew: העריק. (The Defector). (2011).
