= House of Spies =

2017 novel by Daniel Silva

- First edition (US)
- Author: Daniel Silva
- Language: English
- Series: Gabriel Allon series
- Genre: Spy fiction Thriller
- Publisher: HarperCollins
- Publication place: United States
- Media type: Print (hardback and paperback)
- ISBN: 978-0-00-810473-3
- Preceded by: The Black Widow
- Followed by: The Other Woman

House of Spies is a 2017 spy novel by Daniel Silva. It is the seventeenth Gabriel Allon series. It was released on July 11, 2017 and debuted on the New York Times Bestseller list at #1.

== Plot ==
Gabriel Allon is now the head of Israeli intelligence, but he has retained the former chief, Uzi Navot, to handle some of the routine tasks while Gabriel focuses on the really big problems. The Islamic State is following up the Paris and Washington, D.C., bombings of the previous novel, The Black Widow, with disastrous attacks on London and Paris. Gabriel is in the Paris building when it is bombed, but he survives. He focuses on the route by which arms are being distributed. A wealthy Frenchman from Marseilles whose hospitality empire serves to launder the proceeds of his drug trafficking turns out to be the thread that leads Gabriel and his team to Morocco, where they encounter fire demons, a drug traffic organizer, and "Saladin," the antagonist of the previous book, who is the mastermind of the bomb attacks on Western Europe and America.
