= The English Girl =

2013 novel by Daniel Silva

- First edition (US)
- Author: Daniel Silva
- Language: English
- Series: Gabriel Allon series
- Genre: Spy fiction Thriller
- Publisher: Harper
- Publication date: 2013
- Publication place: United States
- Media type: Print (hardback and paperback)
- Pages: 496
- Preceded by: The Fallen Angel
- Followed by: The Heist

The English Girl is a 2013 spy novel by Daniel Silva. It is the thirteenth Gabriel Allon series. It was released in July 2013. It reached the top of The New York Times bestseller list on July 25, 2013 and number 5 on the Wall Street Journal's list.

== Plot synopsis ==
British political worker Madeline Hart is kidnapped in Corsica and former Israeli spy and assassin Gabriel Allon is soon invited by deputy director Graham Seymour of MI5 to find her as she is the mistress of British Prime Minister Jonathan Lancaster and was made by her kidnappers to film a testimonial implicating Lancaster in order to blackmail him.

Gabriel goes to crime boss Don Orsati in Corsica who once agreed to have him killed at the behest of Swiss bankers (in The English Assassin) to ask for guidance and Orsati both lets Gabriel use the services of Christopher Keller, a former SAS officer believed dead (and Gabriel's erstwhile would-be assassin) and tells him that a man named Paul came to ask for a fast boat and points him to smuggler Marcel Lacroix in Marseilles.

Gabriel and Keller capture Lacroix, who upon torture gives up local crime syndicate member René Brossard as his immediate contact and who says that when he learned it was a high-profile kidnapping he demanded more money and plans to meet with Brossard in Aix the next day to receive it. Keller kills Lacroix, and Gabriel and Keller keep watch on Lacroix's meeting site to follow Brossard to a villa in the Luberon. Keller monitors the villa for a couple days while Gabriel jets off to Paris to update Graham, but when they storm the house together one barely surviving criminal reports that Madeline left three days earlier.

With the trail cold and the blackmailer's deadline near, Gabriel goes to Lancaster in London where the blackmail demand finally arrives: 10 million euros and, surprisingly, Gabriel to deliver the money. The money and the girl both check out, but the handoff is set up in such a way that Gabriel watches the car Madeline's in explode (as he watched his ex-wife and son die before the events of the series) rather than saves her and loses the money too.

While Gabriel's in Israel to recuperate, Gabriel's former boss Ari Shamron wins Gabriel's agreement to head the Office (the Mossad) in exchange for the Office's support in figuring out who's responsible for Madeline's kidnapping and death. Back in London, Gabriel approaches journalist Samantha Cooke, who wrote an article about the unanswered questions about Madeline's death, and learns that Madeline's family vanished after her kidnapping and that Lancaster's chief of staff Jeremy Fallon also loved Madeline and is now leaving his position to run for Parliament to aim for Chancellor of the Exchequer after completing a final deal with Russian oil firm Volgatek.

Gabriel and Keller visit Madeline's family's house only to observe another interloper there speaking Russian and demonstrating excellent tradecraft, whom Gabriel also saw tailing him earlier. Gabriel asks exiled Russian oil billionaire Viktor Orlov for help to prove Russian involvement. Orlov says Volgatek under his former deputy Gennady Lazarev is former KGB through and through and that he counselled the government not to take the deal but Fallon overruled him after taking five million euros from the firm, though Orlov won't reveal his source.

Gabriel and Orlov prepare Gabriel's man Mikhail Abramov to serve as Orlov's heir apparent as Nicholas Avedon but to be apparently seduced by Lazarev into betraying Orlov during which conversation he finds that Volgatek's security chief Pavel Zhirov is their Paul. Mikhail as Avedon goes to Moscow with Gabriel's team shadowing him to negotiate his contract, and the gang abducts Zhirov who after torture confesses that he suborned Fallon on behalf of the Russian president, killed Madeline so as not to have Russian influence unraveled by an investigation, and demanded that Gabriel deliver the money to have a credible witness to the manner of her death. But Gabriel doesn't buy his story and with a further threat learns that Madeline was a Russian agent all along.

Gabriel meets Madeline in St. Petersburg to learn that she was a lifelong sleeper agent activated into a political career to compromise Lancaster to win the oil deal, but she now wants out of Russia. Gabriel and the gang sneak her out of Russia by El Al.

Lancaster's party wins the parliamentary election. Fallon becomes Chancellor and Graham's to head MI6. Gabriel delivers Madeline to Graham as a defector and they stage an apology for Lancaster's affair to get Fallon to overcommit, then take him down when he moves to withdraw some of the money in Zurich. Gabriel tries to recruit Keller to join either him or MI6 on his recommendation, but Keller's uninterested and Orsati believes the invitation impolitic.

Gabriel's wife Chiara is pregnant with twins.
