= The Marching Season =

1999 novel by Daniel Silva

- First edition (US)
- Author: Daniel Silva
- Language: English
- Genre: Crime, mystery, thriller
- Publisher: Random House (US); Weidenfeld & Nicolson (UK)
- Publication date: 1999
- Publication place: United States
- Media type: Print
- Pages: 418
- ISBN: 0375500898 (US)
- Preceded by: The Mark of the Assassin
- Followed by: The Kill Artist

The Marching Season is a 1999 spy fiction novel by Daniel Silva.

It is the sequel to The Mark of the Assassin, by the same author.

== Plot summary ==
Former Agent Michael Osbourne is re-recruited by the CIA when his father-in-law Douglas Cannon, the new ambassador to the Court of St. James, is sent to the United Kingdom to promote the peace process between Protestants and Catholics of Northern Ireland, which has been jeopardized by three bloody attempts to derail them. Michael must once again face the elusive and lethal KGB-trained assassin October, with whom he has unfinished business.

== International titles ==
- Portuguese: A Marcha. (The March). (2011). ISBN 9789722522731
