= The Unlikely Spy =

1996 novel by Daniel Silva

- First edition (US)
- Author: Daniel Silva
- Language: English
- Genre: Crime, mystery, thriller
- Publisher: Villard (US); Weidenfeld & Nicolson (UK)
- Publication date: 1996
- Publication place: United States
- Media type: Print
- Pages: 481
- ISBN: 0679455620
- Followed by: The Mark of the Assassin

The Unlikely Spy is a 1996 spy novel written by Daniel Silva, set during World War II.

While some of the characters and events are fictional, the book is based on the real-life attempt by the Allies to use British intelligence to cover up the true plans for D-Day. The deception plan was called Operation Fortitude, and Double Cross also played a role. Specifically, the book has a backdrop (a subset of Fortitude referred to as Fortitude South).

== Plot ==
Set during World War II, the book follows Alfred Vicary, a historian and friend of Winston Churchill, who was wounded in battle during the World War I while serving as an officer in the Intelligence Corps, joins the British intelligence service. He is assigned the job of protecting Operation Mulberry in the lead up to the invasion of Normandy in 1944. The German spy Catherine Blake, whose real name is Anna von Steiner, an Abwehr operative, actually is close to learning the secret. Catherine's aid is Horst Neumann, a former lieutenant in the paratroopers and later on in the Abwehr, a trained assassin.

Some little failures help Alfred Vicary to reveal her true identity. So he devises and carries out his plan of Double Cross. The basic idea of it is that after uncovering the German spy Catherine Blake, instead of capturing and imprisoning her, the British Intelligence provides her with false documents which she accepts as information she seeks. Then she sends the content of those papers through other spies to Germany, and so the German Spy agencies are being deceived without having the least idea of it. The story ends with depiction of the night Catherine tries to escape from Britain. If she could have fled she would be able to tell all she knew about British Intelligence agents and their Double Cross operation, and maybe Germans would understand that they had been deceived all the time. Catherine does not manage to escape, and is killed by the fire laid down by a British warship. The Germans, therefore, remain ignorant of the secret they tried to reveal and this causes their defeat in World War II.

== Reception ==
Scott Veale, writing for the New York Times, called the book "strictly a connect-the-dots adventure" and criticised its length and style.

== International titles ==
- Portuguese: O Espião Improvável. (The Unlikely Spy). (2012). ISBN 9789722523929
- Slovak: prísne tajné. (Top Secret). 2011. ISBN 9788022016162

== Bibliography ==
- Veale, Scott (February 9, 1997). "The Unlikely Spy". New York Times.
- "Prísne tajné". Martinus.
- "O Espião Improvável". In WorldCat.
- The Unlikely Spy. The Library of Congress Catalog Record. 1996. ISBN 978-0-679-45562-2.
