= The Confessor (novel) =

2003 spy fiction novel by Daniel Silva

- The Confessor
- Author: Daniel Silva
- Language: English
- Series: Gabriel Allon series
- Genre: Crime, mystery, tfgreathriller
- Publisher: G. P. Putnam's Sons (US)
- Publication date: 2003
- Publication place: United States
- Media type: Print
- Pages: 401
- ISBN: 0399149724 (US)
- Preceded by: The English Assassin
- Followed by: A Death in Vienna

The Confessor is a 2003 spy fiction novel by Daniel Silva. It is the third book in the Gabriel Allon series. In this novel, Gabriel Allon is asked to investigate the murder of Holocaust scholar Benjamin Stern in Munich. As Allon follows Stern's research, he becomes the target of a larger conspiracy to hide damaging information about the role of the Catholic Church during the Holocaust.

== Plot ==
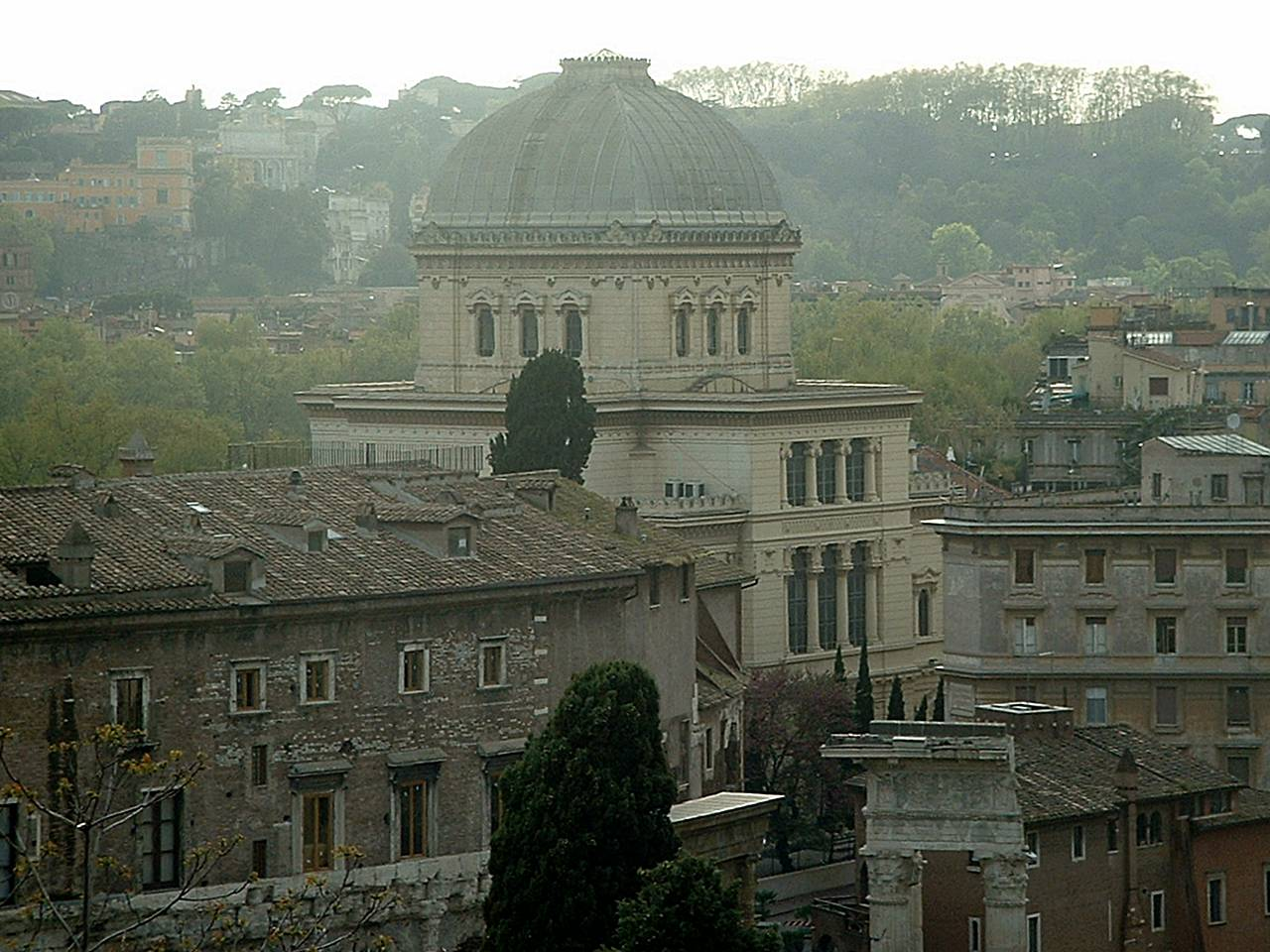
The Great Synagogue of Rome, the location where the fictional pope Paul VII plans to address the Jewish people

Mossad agent Gabriel Allon is asked to investigate the murder of Holocaust scholar Benjamin Stern in Munich. Allon learns that Stern had visited the Convent of the Sacred Heart in the village of Brenzone and contacts its superior, Mother Vincenza. She affirms that Stern had met with her to research places where Jews sought refuge during the Holocaust and she shows Allon a basement where Jews purportedly stayed. Allon travels to London, where he finds that Stern's death was orchestrated by Crux Vera, a secret society established to defend the reputation and power of the Catholic Church at all costs. Shortly after Allon leaves, his informant is killed by Eric "Leopard" Lange, the same hitman who murdered Stern.

Meanwhile, an internal power struggle develops within the Vatican as the newly elected Pope Paul VII announces his desire to speak at the synagogue of Rome. This angers powerful members of Crux Vera, including Cardinal Marco Brindisi and security chief Carlo Cassagrande. Crux Vera closely watches Allon's mission with the intent of killing him.

Eric Lange anticipates that Allon will seek out detective Alessio Rossi and has him followed. Allon contacts Rossi in Rome, who surmises that the disappearance of the two missing priests points to a cover up within the Vatican. Police arrive on the scene and shoot at the two men, killing Rossi and wounding Allon.

Allon travels to the Provence to meet with Antonia Huber, whose mother Sister Regina had witnessed a clandestine meeting between Nazi agents and members of the Vatican on the premises of the Brenzone abbey. In this meeting, members of the Curia assured the cooperation of the Vatican with removal of the Jews. Sister Regina wrote an account and gave a copy of the letter to Stern. Allon feels certain that the series of disappearances and murders relates to the pact between Nazi and Curia elements.

Back in Munich, Allon meets with Shamron, his superior at the Mossad. Shamron notifies Allon of the pope's intention to speak at the synagogue of Rome and surmises that the pope's mission and life is in danger from the same people that killed Stern. He urges Allon to share the documents with the pope. Meanwhile, Crux Vera hires Lange to assassinate the pope at the synagogue.

Through his contacts in the art restoration community, Allon secures a private audience with Pope Paul VII. Paul VII ignores Allon's admonition to cancel the appointment at the synagogue and instead suggests that Allon personally accompany him within the pope's security team. The pope's speech at the synagogue proves uneventful.

Cassagrande secretly renounces his role in the pope's assassination and instead hires Lange to kill its instigator, Brindisi. Cassagrande then commits suicide. Details of Brindisi and Cassagrande's plot are leaked to the press and the pope seizes the opportunity to rid the Curia of members of the Crux Vera. Shamron returns to Tel Aviv and creates Team Leopard, a task force devoted to identifying and killing Eric Lange. The story ends months later when Allon personally locates and kills Lange.

== International titles ==
- Portuguese: O Confessor. (The Confessor). (2005). ISBN 9789722514392
