= The Mark of the Assassin =

1998 novel by Daniel Silva

- First edition (US)
- Author: Daniel Silva
- Language: English
- Genre: Crime, mystery, thriller
- Publisher: Villard (US); Weidenfeld & Nicolson (UK)
- Publication date: 1998
- Publication place: United States
- Media type: Print
- Pages: 465
- ISBN: 0679455639 (US)
- Preceded by: The Unlikely Spy
- Followed by: The Marching Season

The Mark of the Assassin is a 1998 spy fiction novel by Daniel Silva.

== Synopsis ==
When a terrorist bomb blows a plane out of the sky off the east coast, there is only one chilling clue. A body found near the crash site bears the deadly calling card of an elusive, lethal assassin - three bullets to the face. Michael Osbourne of the CIA knows the markings. Personally.

== International titles ==
- Portuguese: A Marca do Assassino. (The Mark of the Assassin). (2011). ISBN 9789722523219
