= The English Spy =

2015 novel by Daniel Silva

- First edition (US)
- Author: Daniel Silva
- Language: English
- Series: Gabriel Allon series
- Published: 2015
- Publisher: HarperCollins
- Publication date: June 30, 2015
- Publication place: United States
- Media type: Hardcover
- Pages: 475
- ISBN: 978-0-06-232013-1
- Preceded by: The Heist
- Followed by: The Black Widow
- Website: The English Spy

The English Spy is the fifteenth in Daniel Silva's Gabriel Allon series. It was released on June 30, 2015, and reached the top of the New York Times bestseller list on July 19. With the ever-changing political climate, he faces challenges in writing an Israeli protagonist.

== Plot, background, place in series ==
In an elaborate plot to lure Gabriel Allon into a trap, an English royal princess is killed by a bomb. The princess's life story includes elements based on that of Princess Diana (who died in 1997), as Silva points out in his "Author's Note," but, as he also notes, the bombing of a royal personage on a boat is based on the 1979 death of Lord Mountbatten at the hands of the IRA. The plot is engineered by the Russian government in vengeance for Allon's interference with their plans in The English Girl (2013).

The bomber is a former Real IRA member who turns out to have been a friend of the Palestinian bomber who, about 25 years earlier, killed Allon's son, so the pursuit becomes personal for him. Silva notes that the history of his fictional bomber is based on the careers of real ex-IRA bombers who taught their skills to various terrorists in the Muslim world. This relationship between bombers links The English Spy to the first Allon novel, The Kill Artist (2000) in which Allon avenges his son's death.

The "English spy" of the book's title is Christopher Keller, who was the eponymous English Assassin of the second book in the Allon series (2002), and who accompanied Allon on his operations in The English Girl (2013) and The Heist (2014). In this book, Keller confronts old enemies from his stint in Northern Ireland as a member of the SAS Regiment. At the end, Keller agrees to renounce his life as an expatriate gun-for-hire and join MI6. Gabriel Allon becomes the father of twins and is on the verge of becoming the director of the Israeli Intelligence Services.
