= Black Widower (disambiguation) =

"Black Widower" is Series 3, Episode 21 of animated sitcom The Simpsons.

Black Widower may also refer to:

== Film and TV ==
- Black Widower (2006), a made-for-TV film about convicted murderer Lowell Amos
- "Black Widower" (2016), Series 3, Episode 1 of the New Zealand murder mystery series The Brokenwood Mysteries
- "Black Widower", Series 3, Episode 20 of the sitcom The Wayans Bros

== Literature ==
- Black Widowers, a fictional men-only dining club created by Isaac Asimov for a series of mystery stories.

== See also ==
- Black Widow (disambiguation)
