= Margarita Sánchez Gutiérrez =

- Born: 26 December 1953 (age 72); Málaga, Spain
- Conviction: Robbery
- Penalty: 34 years in prison

Details
- Victims: 4
- Span of crimes: 1992–
- Country: Spain

Margarita Sánchez Gutiérrez (born 26 December 1953, in Málaga), also known as the "Black Widow of Barcelona" and "The Black Widow of Hospitalet", is a suspected Spanish serial killer who received her name for her method of murder – by poisoning the food and drinks she offered her victims, similar to the black widow spider. She managed to kill four people and poisoned three others who managed to survive. All of the victims were close to her, including family members and neighbours.

When she moved to Catalonia she first lived in L'Hospitalet de Llobregat, on Riera Blanca Street, where she was known as "la bizca". This was a modest neighbourhood of workers, where she was considered a troubled woman, but without a criminal record. According to neighbours, she was prone to insults and street fights, and had debts in some shops in the area; she was greedy and seemingly illiterate according to what she declared to the police. In 1991 Margarita moved with her husband, Luis Navarro, and their children Sonia and Javi to their in-laws' floor, partly because they had been discouraged but also to take care of her husband's father. Margarita and Carmen Nuez, her mother-in-law, did not get along because apparently, the latter was a woman of authority and great character. In 1992, the father-in-law died and Carmen was hospitalized five times in the Clinical Hospital where she proclaimed her daughter-in-law was poisoning her. However, the performing analyzers gave negative results.

She was arrested in June 1996 and charged with four counts of murder and three counts of attempted murder. She was acquitted of the murder and attempted murder charges but convicted of assault, robbery with violence, and fraud. The court found that her intention had been to drug and rob her relatives, not to kill them.

In January 1998, Margarita Sánchez Gutiérrez was sentenced to 34 years in prison. After her release in 2016 she was reported to be living in the La Maurina neighbourhood of Terrassa.

== See also ==
- List of serial killers by country
