= Margit Filó =

Hungarian serial killer (1914–1979)

- Born: Margit Julianna Elek; June 10, 1914; Magyarcsanád, Austria-Hungary
- Died: April 9, 1979 (aged 64); Lipótmező Mental Asylum, Budapest, Hungarian People's Republic
- Other names: "The Rókus Black Widow"; Mrs. Mihály Barna; Mrs. Sándor Varga
- Conviction: N/A
- Penalty: Involuntary commitment

Details
- Victims: 4–6
- Span of crimes: 1958–1968
- Country: Hungary
- State: Csongrád-Csanád
- Date apprehended: July 9, 1968

Margit Julianna Elek (June 10, 1914 – April 9, 1979), known as The Rókus Black Widow, was a Hungarian serial killer who poisoned at least four people between 1958 and 1968. Ruled incompetent to stand trial, she was transferred to a mental hospital in Budapest, where she subsequently died.

== Early life ==
Margit Filó was born on June 10, 1914, on Attila Street in Makó. Her family was poor, and so, Margit was forced to work from childhood. In 1938, she was interred at a closed psychiatric hospital due to schizophrenia, and after her release, she was contracted to work at Ferenc nagy's poultry farm in Makó. In 1949, she began quarreling with her employer over the work conditions at the farm, eventually successfully suing him for 14,000 forints. Using this money, she bought a housing complex on 38 Hétvezér Street in Szeged's Rókus District, and allowing tenants to use the upper floor apartments. Filó was disappointed that she had to occupy a ground floor apartment, unlike the poorer residents of the building, who were allocated flats on the upper floors by the city council.

At a young age, Filó maintained relationships primarily with women, but in 1950, she met and married chimney sweeper and former veteran Mihály Barna. In 1952, she was interned at a mental hospital for a short time, but when she was discharged, she and her husband bought a house in Debrecen. However, despite being relatively well off, Filó continued to perform her duties in dirty clothes. For the next eight years, the couple lived together, seemingly without any issues, but over time, Barna's health deteriorated to the point that he needed constant care. As a result, his mother moved in with the couple, with Margit hiring 73-year-old Lajosné Biczó as a domestic aide to nurse her husband. In the late 1950s, both Barna and his mother died in quick succession, but it couldn't be conclusively proven that they had been murdered.

== Murders ==
In the year after her husband's death, Filó began a relationship with the 62-year-old wealthy farmer Sándor Varga, whom she had met on the market. Varga owned a good quality house and his own estate in Kiszombor, where the couple would soon settle in, bringing Biczó along with them. In October 1958, Filó incapacitated Biczó with medicine dissolved in a glass of water and then suffocated the woman while she was unconscious by pressing her hands against her mouth and nose until she couldn't breathe. The autopsy concluded that Biczó had been killed in a homicidal manner, and Filó was arrested, but since authorities were unable to conclusively prove that she was the killer, they released her. According to her will, Biczó's movable property was then transferred to Filó.

In the autumn of 1959, Varga and Filó officially married, with Sándor naming his newlywed wife as his sole heir. Barely two months after the wedding, on Christmas, Filó extracted poison from thorn apple leaves collected at the edge of town, which she put into some cabbage prepared for her husband. Varga and two other family members became violently ill from the poison, but did not die, so his wife repeated the act two days later, this time poisoning a soup, from whose effects Sándor finally succumbed. After Varga's property was transferred to her, Filó sold it all and then moved back to Rókus.

The next murder occurred in 1963, when Filó came across 75-year-old Iloná Siegel, a neighbor who was very sickly. She offered to make a monetary contract with Siegel, who agreed, and just after the pair departed, Filó visited a tombstone manufacturer and placed an order for Siegel. Two weeks later, she poisoned Siegel with the previous medicinal extract, and while her victim was unconscious, she strangled her with a pillow or a quilt. The coroner detected nothing suspicious about the death, and thusly Siegel's properties, worth 20,000 forints, were given to Filó.

Over the next few years, Filó began to grow tired of her poor tenants, wishing to kick them out and replace with some of the industrial workers who were moving to Szeged. By 1968, she managed to convince several residents to leave, but one of them, a 77-year-old widow Mrs. Mihály Tóthpál, refused. Deciding that she wanted to get rid of her, Filó signed a business deal with Tóthpál, and on July 9, 1968, she poisoned, beat and strangled her. However, while abusing her elderly victim, she unwittingly broke several of her ribs, which was noticed by the coroners. This finding was reported to the police, who immediately arrested Margit Filó as a suspect in the murder.

== Investigation and internment ==
While searching her house, authorities stumbled upon several human skulls and several kilograms of toxic substances. When questioned about these items, Filó claimed that she had stolen the skulls from the local cemetery, and that the poisons were for spells and potions which she supposedly used on acquaintances to fall in love with her. Sensing that she might've had previous experiences in killings, police exhumed the bodies of Siegel, Varga and Barna, managing to prove that, with the exception of Barna, the victims had been poisoned. Investigators also learned that the will of Lajosné Biczó from 1958 was a forgery, and that Filó's then-fiancée, Sándor Varga, had actually signed it. When brought to court, Filó tried to explain that she had killed her victims for humanitarian purposes, as, according to her, they were visibly suffering. She also claimed that their deaths benefitted the Hungarian People's Republic, as the state would no longer be required to pay pensions to them.

The court, taking into account that Filó had been interred at mental institutions on two previous occasions, ordered her to undergo a psychiatric reevaluation. During the tests, Filó initially denied any responsibility, but then started claiming that she had had nine husbands in total, and that she would confess if the doctors gave her bread and tomatoes. Following this incident, she was diagnosed with schizophrenia and dissociative identity disorder, rendering her incapable of standing trial. Because of this, Filó was transferred to the Lipótmező Mental Asylum, where she remained until her death. The building on 38 Hétvezér Street was later demolished, and later replaced by a modern residential building.

== See also ==
- List of serial killers by country
