= Heloísa Gonçalves Duque Soares Ribeiro =

Brazilian criminal

- Born: Heloísa Borba Gonçalves; March 13, 1950 (age 76); Porto Alegre, Rio Grande do Sul, Brazil
- Other names: "The Black Widow" "The Queen of Telephones"; Heloísa Saad; Matilde Irene Gomes da Silva; Heloísa Duque Soares Lopes; Heloísa Lopes; Heloísa Saad Lopez
- Convictions: Murder; Bigamy; Fraud
- Penalty: 18 years (murder); 6 years (others)

Details
- Victims: 4+
- Span of crimes: 1992 (confirmed); 1971 – 1992 (suspected)
- Country: Brazil
- States: Rio de Janeiro (confirmed); Rio Grande do Sul, Bahia (accused)
- Date apprehended: N/A

Heloísa Gonçalves Duque Soares Ribeiro (née Heloísa Borba Gonçalves; born March 13, 1950), known as The Black Widow (Portuguese: Viúva Negra), is a Brazilian–American criminal, murderer and accused serial killer. Convicted for the murder of one husband and bigamy/fraud charges in absentia, Gonçalves has been accused in at least three other murders and multiple other violent crimes dating back to 1971, but has so far evaded capture. As of January 2024, she is one of Brazil's most wanted criminals and has a red notice issued for her arrest from Interpol.

== Early life ==
Due to her tendency to use aliases and not talk about her life, little can be verified about Gonçalves' past. She was born on March 13, 1950, in Porto Alegre, Rio Grande do Sul, as Heloísa Borba Gonçalves, and had her first child at age 19 with then-boyfriend Carlos Pinto da Silva. She then began a simultaneous relationship with a German doctor named Guenther Joerg Wolff, and became pregnant with his child as well.

On December 27, 1971, the 4-months-pregnant Gonçalves and Wolff decided to go on a trip from Porto Alegre to Taquara in the latter's Volkswagen Karmann Ghia. According to official records, they collided with a truck, as a result of which 38-year-old Wolff died on the spot, but Gonçalves and her unborn child managed to survive. The daughter was born soon after, with Gonçalves inheriting Wolff's house in Porto Alegre as his widow. A year after that, she became a mother for the third time, having her second child with Pinto da Silva.

== Criminal charges ==
=== Suspicious deaths ===
The first violent crime attributed to Gonçalves took place on December 20, 1977, while she, Pinto da Silva, and their children were on vacation in Salvador, Bahia. On that date Pinto da Silva was shot five times in the chest, but managed to survive and identified the assailant as Gonçalves. For reasons unknown, he decided to withdraw the complaint for attempted murder and the case was dropped.

In 1980 Gonçalves was arrested on fraud charges for signing a document under the name "Matilde Irene Gomes da Silva". Unwilling to be imprisoned again, from then on she would legally adopt her future husbands' surnames to avoid trouble. A year after this, she began a relationship with Portuguese security guard Irineu Duque Soares and had a child with him that same year, but the pair did not officially marry until May 13, 1983. In October of that year, the family and their nanny were en route to Magé, Rio de Janeiro, when they suddenly got flagged down by another car – when Duque got out to see what was going on, the other driver shot him twice in the chest and then stole his money before fleeing. Officially, the case was registered as a robbery-homicide.

In the late 1980s Gonçalves bigamously married two different men: military policeman Roberto de Souza Lopes and Colonel Jorge Ribeiro, having a child with the latter born in 1987. On May 8, 1990, she married yet another man, an elderly Syrian businessman named Nicolau Saad – both Saad and Ribeiro would then claim to be the fathers of a child born in that same year, but was known under two different names. On December 29, 1991, Nicolau Saad was found dead at his home – the official cause of death was attributed to his advanced cancer and a heart attack, but coroners found that he had somehow broken his arm in unexplained circumstances beforehand.

=== Murder of Jorge Ribeiro ===
By the beginning of 1992 Gonçalves and Ribeiro had already divorced, but she still wanted to acquire his personal properties and assets. To do this, she hired an unidentified individual to break into her ex-husband's office in Copacabana and kill him. When he did so, the man bound and gagged Ribeiro with a plastic bag and nylon ropes, before proceeding to hit him several times in the face and head with a sledgehammer. Ribeiro's skull was fractured, killing him almost instantly.

Shortly after his death Gonçalves inherited his phone line service, earning her the nickname "The Queen of Telephones" (Portuguese: Rainha dos Telefones), taken after her late ex-husband nickname "The King of Telephones" (Portuguese: Rei dos Telefones).

=== Further crimes ===
On November 28, 1992, Gonçalves married yet again – this time to Lebanese-born merchant Wagih Elias Murad. She became a godmother to his family on his son's side, all of whom were unaware of her shady past.

Five months after Murad's son Elie had married and only ten days after his grandson had been born, Wagih was hanging around with his friend Wagner Laino in Recreio dos Bandeirantes when an unidentified man approached from a taxi and shot them both to death before fleeing. Convinced that this was done on the behest of his godmother, Elie Murad used his position as a business administrator to hire private detectives that would look into her past. To his shock, he discovered that Gonçalves was a bigamist and fraudster whose ex-husbands and boyfriends had either been murdered, died in suspicious circumstances or were almost killed by persons unknown – allowing her to inherit their possessions and properties.

On October 11, 1993, Murad and police officer Luiz Marques de Motta, who was helping him with his private investigation, were driving to a local police station in the Barra neighborhood when they were ambushed by two unidentified men driving in another car. The gunmen opened fire on both, hitting De Motta at least three times and killing him on the spot, while Murad was hit in the head, but managed to survive after spending two weeks in an intensive care unit.

== Prosecution, escape, and manhunt ==
After spending some time to recover from the attempt on his life, Murad continued his investigation into Gonçalves, which eventually culminated into an aggravated murder charge being filed against her in August 2005 for the murder of Jorge Ribeiro. However, she appealed the decision and the trial date was postponed for several years.

Sometime circa 2010 Gonçalves went into hiding and has been on the run ever since. As a result, prosecutor Patrícia Glioche issued two arrest warrants on the aggravated murder and bigamy charges, as well as announcing a R$2,000 prize for any information that could lead to Gonçalves' arrest. It was eventually decided that she should be tried in absentia, as a result of which she was swiftly convicted and sentenced to 18 years imprisonment.

=== Current status ===
As of November 2025 Gonçalves remains one of the country's most dangerous and most wanted fugitives, ranking among drug lords and gang members. A warrant has been issued for her arrest by Interpol, and she is currently sought in a total of 188 countries.

Prosecutors following her case have indicated that she may be hiding somewhere within Brazil, with possible locations being her home state of Rio Grande do Sul, Paraná, the Barra da Tijuca and Jardim Botânico neighborhoods of Rio de Janeiro and Niterói. Information posted from Interpol indicates that she likely fled to the United States in 1994, gaining dual citizenship and continuing to marry and divorce husbands. Her last reported sighting was in May 2010 in Boca Raton, Florida, with her then-husband, Peruvian national Vicente Lopez Huaman, and it is said that Gonçalves has family members living in the states of California, Virginia and New York. The current reward for her arrest stands at more than R$11,000.

== See also ==
- List of fugitives from justice who disappeared
