= The Secret Servant (Silva novel) =

2007 spy novel by Daniel Silva

- The Secret Servant
- Author: Daniel Silva
- Language: English
- Series: Gabriel Allon series
- Genre: Spy fiction, crime, mystery, thriller
- Publisher: G. P. Putnam's Sons (US)
- Publication date: 2007
- Publication place: United States
- Media type: Print
- Pages: 385
- ISBN: 9780399154225 (US)
- Preceded by: The Messenger
- Followed by: Moscow Rules

The Secret Servant is a 2007 spy novel by Daniel Silva. It spent six weeks as a New York Times bestseller.

== Plot summary ==
In this entry in the series, Gabriel Allon, the master art restorer and sometime officer of Israeli intelligence, has just prevailed in his blood-soaked duel with Saudi terrorist financier Zizi al-Bakari. Now he is summoned once more by his masters to undertake what appears to be a routine assignment: travel to Amsterdam to purge the archives of a murdered Dutch terrorism analyst who also happened to be an asset of Israeli intelligence. But once in Amsterdam, Gabriel soon discovers a terrorist conspiracy festering in the city’s Islamic underground: a plot that is about to explode on the other side of the English Channel, in the middle of London.

The target of this plot is Elizabeth Halton, the daughter of the American ambassador to the Court of St. James's, who is to be brutally kidnapped. Gabriel arrives seconds too late to save her. And by revealing his face to the plot’s masterminds, his fate is sealed as well.

Drawn once more into the service of American intelligence, Gabriel hurls himself into a desperate search for the missing woman as the clock ticks steadily toward the hour of her execution.

== International titles ==
- Portuguese: O Criado Secreto. (The Secret Servant). (2008). ISBN 9789722516754
