= The Other Woman (Silva novel) =

2018 novel by Daniel Silva

- First edition (US)
- Author: Daniel Silva
- Language: English
- Series: Gabriel Allon series
- Genre: Spy fiction Thriller
- Publisher: Harper
- Publication place: United States
- Media type: Print (hardback and paperback)
- Preceded by: House of Spies

The Other Woman is a 2018 spy novel by Daniel Silva. It is the eighteenth book in the Gabriel Allon series. It opens in a remote Andalusian village, gradually unfolding the story of a Russian mole in British intelligence. It was released on July 17, 2018 and debuted at number 1 in the August 5 edition of the New York Times Bestseller list. It remained on the list for seven weeks through September 16.

== Plot ==
This novel depicts modern European intelligence services such as the SVR and MI6 still playing out the antagonism between the Soviet Union and the Western Bloc. Kim Philby, the great mole in the historic MI6, exemplifies the dedication of Soviet sympathizers of the past. Gabriel Allon is framed for the murder of a Russian agent; Gabriel then accuses a British intelligence officer of being a Russian mole who set up the frame. He quickly realizes, however, that the man he accused was innocent. The story of Kim Philby guides him to a confrontation with the real mole, who is captured by the British but then allowed to defect, since a formal trial would embarrass them. Gabriel also learns of a Russian "handler" named Sasha who worked both with Philby and with the new mole.
