= The Messenger (Silva novel) =

2006 novel by Daniel Silva

- The Messenger
- Author: Daniel Silva
- Language: English
- Series: Gabriel Allon series
- Genre: Spy fiction, crime, mystery, thriller
- Publisher: G. P. Putnam's Sons (US)
- Publication date: 2006
- Publication place: United States
- Media type: Print
- Pages: 338
- ISBN: 9780399153358 (US)
- Preceded by: Prince of Fire
- Followed by: The Secret Servant

The Messenger (2006) is a spy novel by Daniel Silva.

== Plot summary ==
When the laptop of a terrorist mastermind falls into the possession of the Office, Gabriel Allon suspects an imminent attack upon the Pope. He warns his friend Luigi Donati, the Pope's personal secretary, in time to tighten security and personally investigate likely terrorist suspects among the Vatican's staff. However, the Pope ignores Gabriel's suggestion that a large outdoor ceremony be moved into an enclosed—and more secure—structure. That disregard proves fatal when three suicide bombers cause more than 700 deaths among worshipers. Gabriel rescues the Pope just as more terrorists arrive to shoot missiles at the Basilica. As the Vatican later researches the disaster, it discovers that its council for improving relations with the Muslim world was little more than a front for inside terrorism.

When the Office places the blame on a powerful terrorist network, terrorists respond by bombing the vehicle of Ari Shamron, the head of the Office and Gabriel's close friend. As Shamron fights for his life, Gabriel joins a member of the CIA in a secret scheme to infiltrate the vast network of "Zizi", a terrorism financier linked to both the bombing and the attack on Shamron's life.

They select Sarah Bancroft, an American art curator with a wealthy European upbringing, to penetrate Zizi's organization. When she and art dealer Julian Isherwood sell Zizi, an art aficionado, an undiscovered Van Gogh, Zizi takes the bait and hires Sarah as his personal art director. He introduces her to his "family" by inviting her on an idyllic cruise in the Caribbean.

Gabriel and his team tail Sarah with the hope that she'll be able to identify Ahmed bin Shafiq, the man who orchestrates the many terrorist activities that Zizi funds. However, Gabriel's team shows too much interest in Sarah, and they quickly arouse the suspicion of Zizi's professional security team. On the night that Gabriel plans to assassinate bin Shafiq, Zizi's party preempts his move and takes Sarah hostage.

Sarah is secreted away to Switzerland, where she is heavily drugged with truth serum and forced to reveal the identities of Gabriel's colleagues. In a desperate race against time, Gabriel's team locates Sarah, kills her captors, and frees her. She in turn reveals that bin Shafiq, believing her death to be imminent, taunted her by stating that he was on his way to yet another terror operation at the Vatican.

This shred of information sends Gabriel rushing back to Rome on the very day that the President of the United States is scheduled for a historic visit with the Pope. The target of the attack—the President—seems obvious, but Gabriel struggles to identify the operative. In an almost imperceptible move, a member of the elite Swiss Guard shoots two bullets at the President. Donati throws himself in front of the President and sustains critical injuries. Donati's sudden movement alerts Gabriel, who kills the renegade guardsman before more shots are fired.

Luigi Donati later recovers from the shooting, Ari Shamron survives the bombing and returns to the Office, Julian Isherwood retires, Sarah Bancroft receives a new life and identity from the CIA, Uzi Navot takes over the directorship of the Office's special operations, and Gabriel Allon rekindles his romance with Chiara Zolli.

Although the elaborate art plot failed, the book ends with two briefly recounted successes: Allon and his team locate and kill both Ahmed bin Shafiq and Zizi.

== International titles ==
- Portuguese: A Mensageira. (The Messenger (female)). (2008). ISBN 9789722515443

== Recognition ==
It spent six weeks as a New York Times Best Seller and was the winner of 2007 Barry Award for Best Thriller.

== Reception ==
Publishers Weekly reported that the author was compared to John le Carré due to his writing in this book, and that the plot keeps the readers "on the edges of their seats." In their review of the audio version, the magazine described the novel as an "exciting, well-crafted thriller."
