= The Black Widow (Silva novel) =

2016 novel by Daniel Silva

- First edition (US)
- Author: Daniel Silva
- Language: English
- Series: Gabriel Allon series
- Published: 2016
- Publisher: HarperCollins
- Publication date: July 12, 2016
- Publication place: United States
- Media type: Hardcover
- Pages: 517
- ISBN: 978-0-06-232022-3
- Preceded by: The English Spy
- Followed by: House of Spies
- Website: The Black Widow

The Black Widow is a 2016 spy novel by Daniel Silva. It is the sixteenth novel in the Gabriel Allon series. It was released on July 12, 2016.

== Plot ==
Terrorists of the Islamic State detonate a massive bomb at a building in Paris where a conference on antisemitism in France is taking place; among those killed is Gabriel Allon's friend Hannah Weinberg. Allon, working with a French counterterrorism unit and the Jordanian intelligence service, discovers that the man behind this operation calls himself Saladin and he is recruiting European women to assist his bombers. Allon trains a Frenchwoman, a doctor who has moved to Israel with her parents, to infiltrate the jihadists. She succeeds in meeting "Saladin" in the caliphate, but is unable to prevent a further, even more disastrous, attack, this time on American soil. Gabriel returns home to Israel to take over leadership of the Israeli secret service and to celebrate his two children's first birthday.

== Relationship to the November 2015 Paris attacks ==
The Black Widow, unusually for the Gabriel Allon series, has a Foreword by the author, as well as the usual Author's Note and Acknowledgements at the end. In the Foreword, Daniel Silva clarifies that his manuscript of this novel was already well developed when, on November 13, 2015, armed suicide bombers attacked in Paris, most notably at the Bataclan theater, and killed about 130 people. As in Silva's novel, some of these terrorists were from the Belgian municipality of Molenbeek. The plot of The Black Widow was of course based on informed speculation, but it came so close to the real story that "it suddenly wasn’t anything that was even remotely entertaining." In his Foreword to the novel Silva says, "After briefly considering setting aside the typescript, I chose to complete it as originally conceived, as though the tragic events had not yet occurred in the imaginary world where my characters live and work."

Adam Kirsch comments on the challenge that ISIS poses in this book, and for the Allon series generally:

Somehow, we want and expect Gabriel Allon to track down Safia [one of "Saladin"'s operatives], thwart the next bombing, and put an end to the ISIS threat. As readers, we want to suspend our disbelief. But how can we, in the face of daily headlines that bring more and more violence?
