= Black Widow (paint mix) =

Black Widow (also known as a Black Widow Ultra in Europe) is a non-commercial open source project to design a paint mix for the base of a DIY projection screen. Anonymous DIYers responsible for popularizing Black Widow in the DIY community include Mechman Alternators (US), Wbassett (US) and Custard10 (EU). The paint mix is made from easily accessible materials and could outperform much more expensive commercial projection screens.

A typical formula for Black Widow is 4 parts commercial water-based matte white paint, tinted with black paint to a shade of N7.8, (Note: Although N8 is acceptable, and simpler to make.) and 1 part water-based fine silver paint.

== History of DIY painted screens ==
Historically, projection screens are either white or gray. Each has advantages and disadvantages. A white screen is more balanced and accurate to the source color when it is close to the international standard illumination conditions (D65). A gray screen is more accurate when parameters such as color balance (L*ab and xyY values), spectral curve, and color temperature are neutral.

Up until the 2010s, a common way to improve a simple neutral gray color was to use mica (pearlescent coating) and poly coatings. However, mica causes color shifting due to thin-film interference. Thus, a non-interference pigment such as aluminum was needed. By adding aluminum-based paint, the gray color is preserved with no color shifting and produces a bright and reflective quality, since aluminum reflects 90 percent of light.

As a non-interference substance, this benefits:

- Better blacks
- Bolder colors
- Whiter whites
- Excellent performance with both ambient light and lights of dedicated setups
- A brighter and more vibrant image without the typical color shifting issues
- Sharper image quality and shadow detail

== Black Widow US ==
Black Widow US is a projection screen paint mix version for the US. The current recommendation for the new formulation is:

- 1 quart (946ml) of "Valspar Ultra Premium Super Flat Finish" tinted (Glidden "Veil") paint from Valspar.
- 8 oz (227ml) of New Formulation "Wicked Colors Aluminium Base Fine" (code: W355) paint from Createx Auto Air Colors. (Note: This was previously called Auto-air Alumium Base Fine 4101 and discontinued in 2021 after merging with Auto-air.)

== Black Widow EU ==
Black Widow EU is a projection screen paint mix version for EU. The current formulation is:

- 4 parts (960ml) of Dulux Grey Steel 2, (NCS code 00NN 53/000; N7.8 darkness on the Munsell scale).
- 1 part (240ml) of "Wicked Colors Aluminium Base Fine" from SM Designs in Northern Ireland. Other variants are not recommended.

Depending on the desired screen darkness, the main DULUX paint can be varied. The recommended paints and their codes are listed:

- Grey Steel1 00NN 31/000 (the darkest hexColor #8e8e8d)
- Grey Steel2 00NN 53/000 ( RGB(184,184,182) - N7.8 hexColor #babab9)
- Grey Steel3 00NN 72/000 ( RGB(219,220,219) - N8.8 hexColor #d8d8d7)
- Grey Steel4 00NN 83/000 ( it is the lightest one - N9.3 hexColor #e8e8e5)

Dulux 'Chic Shadow' can also be used as a substitute for Grey Steel 2 as it is far more available in the UK and has the same NCS.

== Black Widow AU ==
Black Widow AU is a projection screen paint mix version for Australia. The formulation is:

- (960ml) of "Dulux Wash&Wear 1L +Plus Kitchen & Bathroom Vivid White Low Sheen Paint" tinted to "PN2G5 Milton Moon" (this is a DULUX colour) from Bunnings.
- (240ml) of "Wicked Aluminium Base Fine" (code: W355) paint from Airbrush Megastore.

This formula produces a reasonably dark end result (N7.4 based on the Hometheatreshack forums neutral grey scale). Alternatively, "Tranquil Retreat" or "Ashville" can be substituted for "Milton Moon" (also a DULUX colour), if more screen darkness is desired (N7.9 or N8.1). For a darker range (N5.5), Dulux Colour PN2A4 "Timeless Grey" is recommended.

== Recommended painting techniques and safety ==
- Use appropriate protection.
- Apply with high volume low pressure paint spray gun.
- If the paint is too thick, add distilled water to dilute it. Add a maximum of 20% water to paint ratio.
- Use a good quality, low-nap roller. Avoid foam rollers as they have a tendency to create bubbles, which then leave bright spots on the screen's surface.
