= Betty Neumar =

American alleged murderer

- Born: Betty Lafon Johnson; November 27, 1931; Ironton, Ohio
- Died: June 13, 2011 (aged 79); Alexandria, Louisiana
- Other names: Black Widow, Black Widow Granny
- Spouse(s): Clarence Malone (1950–1952; d. 1970); James Flynn (? –1955); Richard Sills (? –1965); Thomas Harold Gentry (1968–1986); John Neumar (1991–2007)
- Children: 3
- Criminal charge: solicitation of murder
- Penalty: pending conviction

Betty Lafon Neumar (November 27, 1931 – June 13, 2011) was an American woman charged with arranging the murder of her fourth husband, Harold Gentry, who died in 1986. The dead man's brother, Al Gentry, had, for 22 years prior to Neumar's arrest in 2007, urged police to investigate his death. Following this arrest, and learning of the fact that Neumar had had five husbands in total who had all died, the case generated much media interest on the part of the news media in the United States, who dubbed Neumar the "Black Widow". On June 13, 2011, Neumar died in an Alexandria, Louisiana hospital of cancer prior to her trial.

== Husbands ==
Betty Lafon Johnson was born in November 1931 in Ironton, Ohio to Odis and Elizabeth Walden Johnson. She graduated from South Point High School in 1949.

She was married five times:

1. (m. 11/25/1950 – div. 1952) Clarence Malone (b. 1931 – d. 1970) remarried twice after the couple split and was shot dead on November 27, 1970, in Medina, Ohio;
2. (m. 02/09/1953 – his death in 1955) James A. Flynn (b. 1927 – d. 1955) was shot dead on a pier in New York;
3. (m. abt. 1956 – his death in 1967) Nelos Richard Sills (b. 07/28/1930 – d. 04/18/1967) died from an allegedly self-inflicted gunshot wound sustained during an argument the couple was having in a closed room in their Big Coppitt Key, Florida home;
4. (m. abt. 1968 – his death in 1986) Thomas Harold Gentry (b. 02/27/1938 – d. 07/13/1986) was found dead in the couple's Norwood, North Carolina home, shot multiple times; and
5. (m. 1991 – his death in 2007) John Neumar (b. 05/22/1928 – d. 10/25/2007) was found dead from apparent natural causes.

Mr. Neumar's cause of death was listed as sepsis, ischemic colitis, and ileus - symptoms that could point to death by arsenic poisoning. Additional reasons his death were considered suspicious came from Neumar's son, John Neumar Jr., who told authorities he was not informed of the death until reading about it in a newspaper. When he contacted the widow about the death, he was told that his father had already been cremated despite having previously bought a burial plot.

== Investigation ==
In May 2008 Neumar was charged with hiring a hit man to kill her husband.

Investigators took a closer look at the deaths of her other husbands, three of whom had been shot dead.

Neumar was extradited to Albemarle, North Carolina in June 2008, a month after her arrest. She was charged with the murder of her fourth husband, Harold Gentry, by North Carolina officials after receiving a tip pointing to her involvement. The indictment alleges that Neumar "sought out a former police officer and her neighbor to kill her husband in the months before his death", with the motive allegedly being his $20,000 life insurance policy.

Charged with three counts of solicitation to commit first-degree murder, Neumar was released in October 2008 on a $300,000 bail bond. Investigators had the ashes of her fifth husband John Neumar seized and analysed for traces of arsenic. The results were negative. A trial date was never set.

== BBC documentary ==
The case of Betty Neumar was the subject of a BBC television documentary, Black Widow Granny?, first aired on BBC One on November 3, 2009. The film featured interviews with friends and relatives, as well as an interview with Neumar, who had otherwise avoided the media.

== Death ==
On June 13, 2011, Betty Neumar died in an Alexandria, Louisiana hospital before her trial. In the "Matriarchs of Murder" episode of Investigation Discovery's anthology Deadly Women, writers claimed that Neumar's death was caused by cancer.

As of December 23, 2012, none of the deaths of her five dead husbands are actively being re-investigated, as well as the death of her first child, Gary Flynn, whose 1985 death was ruled as suicide.
