= Black Widow: A Land Bleeds =

- Directed by: Dinkar Rao
- Written by: Dinkar Rao
- Screenplay by: Dinkar Rao
- Story by: Dinkar Rao
- Produced by: Dinkar Rao, Pavwan Drolia
- Cinematography: Manoj Pradhan
- Edited by: Praveen Angre
- Music by: Subhash Pradhan Bhavesh Bhatt
- Production company: Lavanya Entertainment
- Release date: 2017
- Running time: 110 minutes
- Country: India
- Language: English

Black Widow: A Land Bleeds is an Indian film directed by Dinkar Rao. The plot is about a widow working as a prostitute in Mumbai. The film completed shooting and postproduction and then faced many problems. Its release was significantly delayed due to a ruling by the Central Board of Film Certification.

== Cast ==
- Shivani Grover as Preeti Child Prostitute
- Sanjay Jain as Bell Boy
- Preet Kanwal as Raghu Taxi Driver
- Ali Khan as Colonel
- Sujata Kumar as Ammi
- Ratna Malay as Zoya
- Rajeev Misra as Steward
- Kushal Punjabi as Assassin
- Shakir as Ali the husband
- Denzil Smith as Anthropologist
- Dinyar Terindaaz as Customer
- Vaishnavi as Sana

== Plot ==
The story revolves around a riots widow Zoya working as prostitute in Mumbai's Colaba area.
