= Moscow Rules (novel) =

2008 spy novel by Daniel Silva

- First edition
- Author: Daniel Silva
- Language: English
- Series: Gabriel Allon series
- Genre: Spy fiction, crime, mystery, thriller
- Publisher: G. P. Putnam's Sons (US)
- Publication date: 2008
- Publication place: United States
- Media type: Print (hardback and paperback)
- Pages: 433 (US)
- ISBN: 978-0-399-15501-7 (US)
- Preceded by: The Secret Servant
- Followed by: The Defector

Moscow Rules is a 2008 spy novel by Daniel Silva.

Featuring Gabriel Allon as a spy/assassin who works undercover as an art restorer, Moscow Rules explores the world of a rising Russia. The villain is a rich Russian oligarch who is a weapons dealer. The title is based on the Cold War rules in which CIA agents were trained when operating against the Soviet Union, known as the "Moscow Rules" — for example, "Don't look back, you are never alone".

== Plot summary ==
New terror calls Gabriel Allon away from his wife Chiara and blissful honeymoon in Italy. Boris Ostrovsky, editor of the independent Moskovsky Gazeta, claims to have exclusive information about imminent terror threats to the West and Israel but only dares entrust his knowledge with the now-famous Gabriel Allon. However, Ostrovsky's sudden assassination cuts short his message and leaves intelligence officers within the Israeli-based Office to guess at the scope of the purported threat against their country. Ostrovsky's death, accompanied by the recent murders of two other journalists from the Gazeta, seems to indicate that his message was both urgent and true. Gabriel's drive to uncover this terror threat leads him to Russia, where he must play by a new set of rules that challenge even his abilities as Israel's top intelligence fieldworker.

His encounter with Olga Sukhova, also of the Gazeta, confirms his suspicions that a Russian arms dealer has begun trafficking with well-known terror groups. Olga reveals her source to be Elena Kharkov, the wife of alleged arms dealer Ivan Kharkov—an oligarch with strong ties to both the old and new Kremlin governments. Gabriel saves himself and Olga from an assassination attempt but, in so doing, arouses the suspicion of the FSB, Russia’s security department. Only the quick and heavy-handed negotiations of the Office secure Gabriel’s life and freedom.

Gabriel, however, cannot be dissuaded from continuing his investigation. Upon learning of Elena Kharkov’s fondness for Mary Cassatt’s paintings, Gabriel enlists the help of art specialist and CIA fieldworker Sarah Bancroft in arranging a meeting with Elena. He then forges a Cassatt painting and has Sarah represent it as a tender reflection of her childhood to Elena. After close inspection, Elena concludes that the painting is both a fraud and a pretence for meeting Sarah. The unexpected presence of Ivan prevents Elena from sharing her knowledge, and Gabriel’s team must then follow the Russian aristocrat to France.

When Sarah surprises Elena at a chic San Tropez restaurant, Elena realizes that she must seize this opportunity to assuage her conscience and potentially save thousands of lives. She entrusts herself to Gabriel’s team, informs them of Ivan’s underhanded dealings, offers to turn over his business records, and asks for help in ‘defecting’ from both her husband and her country's corruption. She then travels to Russia with Gabriel's entourage and gathers the sensitive financial information required to prove her husband's complicity to the arms trafficking. The task runs afoul, however, when Ivan's chief of personal security, Arkady Medvedev interrupts the operation and takes Elena, and later Gabriel, hostage. At a vast countryside warehouse filled with weapons, Arkady proudly demonstrates the breadth and shamelessness of Ivan's trafficking. Yet, he is frustrated in his ability to get either Elena or Gabriel to reveal the whereabouts of Ivan and Elena's twin children.

Arkady passes Gabriel on to Grigori Bulganov, an FSB intelligence director, with instructions for Gabriel's murder. Gabriel is surprised to discover that Grigori was his interrogator in his previous detention with the FSB, and his astonishment grows as Grigori reveals his duplicity as both an agent for and, secretly, against Ivan Kharkov and the corruption that he represents. Grigori arms and then returns a supposedly conciliatory Gabriel to Arkady. When Arkady lets down his guard, Grigori and Gabriel kill him and his guards and then free Elena. The three quickly return to Moscow to once again retrieve Ivan's financial documents and to rescue Olga; they then proceed to Ukraine, freedom, and new lives.

Because of the efforts of these four people, governments worldwide avert imminent terror attacks and freeze Ivan Kharkov's business ventures. The U.S. government secrets away Elena and her children, while the UK shelters Olga Sukhova and Grigori Bulganov; the latter two collaborate upon and publish an exhaustive account of Ivan's dealings. Their work overtly implicates the collusion of Russia's government, which denies ties to Ivan while openly harboring him. Gabriel portends to his colleague Ari Shamron that Ivan's days are numbered. However, a serious eye injury (a battle scar from his most recent trip to Russia) prevents Gabriel from pursuing Ivan any further. Indeed, Gabriel fears that his profession as an art restorer is impossible. Yet, time and skilled medical attention allow Gabriel the promise of full recovery—and continued work both as an artist and as a secret agent.

== International titles ==
- Portuguese: As Regras de Moscovo. (The Moscow Rules). (2010). ISBN 9789722520836
