= Christine Malèvre =

French murderer

- Born: 10 January 1970 (age 56)
- Occupation: Nurse
- Criminal charges: Murder

Details
- Locations: François Quesnay Hospital, Mantes-la-Jolie, Paris
- Killed: 30
- Date apprehended: 1998

Christine Malèvre (born 10 January 1970) is a former nurse who was arrested in 1998 on suspicion of having killed as many as 30 patients. She confessed to some of the murders, but claimed she had done so at the request of the patients, who were all terminally ill. France, however, does not recognize a right to die, and Malèvre eventually recanted most of her confessions. The families of several of her victims strongly denied that their relatives had expressed any will to die, much less asked Malèvre to kill them.

== Charges ==
Malèvre initially admitted to assisting in the deaths of 30 terminally ill patients at François Quesnay Hospital in Mantes-la-Jolie. She later recanted, stating that she had made her original confession under duress. Although originally charged with the lesser charge of manslaughter, Malèvre's charge was upgraded to murder, following a report stating that she had a “morbid fascination” with death and disease — patients were three to four times more likely to die during her duty periods.

According to Olivier Morice, a lawyer for families of five patients who had died in Malèvre's care, the charge of murder came about because the judge had realized “we are dealing with a serial killer more than with a Madonna of euthanasia”.

Shortly after her release on bail, Malèvre tried unsuccessfully to commit suicide by overdosing on drugs.

== Trial ==
Malèvre went on trial in Versailles on 20 January 2003 on charges of murdering seven gravely ill patients between 1997 and 1998. She faced up to life in prison. She admitted to having killed four patients by injecting them with lethal doses of morphine, potassium or other drugs, but denied being responsible for the other three deaths. She stated that her reason for lethally injecting these patients was because the patients requested to die, and she helped them to do so out of compassion. In a book she later wrote, called “My Confession”, Malèvre stated “I helped people to end their suffering and depart in peace. I did not kill. I am not a criminal.”

Prosecutors did not agree with her statement. Having been nicknamed "the black widow" by her colleagues, prosecutors told the court that Malèvre's motives for ending the lives of her patients were not merciful, but rather due to her morbid fascination with death and illness; by killing these patients, she was satisfying her compulsions. Families of the deceased also went on the record agreeing with the prosecution that Malèvre killed for her own good, not for the good of her patients, denying that their relatives had ever asked to die, statements which would later turn many of Malèvre's supporters against her.

== Sentencing ==
After a four-hour deliberation, Malèvre was sentenced to ten years' imprisonment for the murder of six of the seven patients she was accused of killing. She was also permanently banned from working as a nurse.

== Public opinion controversy ==
France disallows euthanasia, unlike its neighbours, Belgium and the Netherlands. Malèvre's arrest raised a national debate over the case itself as well as over the controversial topic of euthanasia in France. The country was divided between strong Roman Catholic hostility towards euthanasia and mounting pressure from the liberals to decriminalize assisted suicide.

After initially admitting to having helped 30 gravelly ill patients kill themselves, Malèvre received an outpouring of support from both the public and from ministers. She received over 5,000 letters from the public showing support and appreciation for her acts of compassion, and health minister Bernard Kouchner stated that people should avoid hasty moral judgement when it came to Malèvre's case.

The media were also generally sympathetic toward Malèvre, whom they described as a model nurse who was helping terminally ill patients to end their own lives. However, once details of the case were leaked by judges and family members, public opinion seemed to turn against Malèvre. These leaks stated that the terminally ill patients had neither wanted nor asked her to aid in their suicides. The principal French association supporting the right to die immediately dropped its support for Malèvre. Public opinion quickly turned against her to support the prosecution's opinion that she did not help her patients, but rather was a serial killer who murdered them to satisfy her own compulsions.

== See also ==
- List of serial killers by number of victims
