= Chisako Kakehi =

Japanese serial killer (1946–2024)

- Born: Chisako Kakehi; November 28, 1946; Yahata, Fukuoka, Allied-occupied Japan
- Died: December 26, 2024 (aged 78); Osaka, Japan
- Status: Deceased
- Convictions: Aggravated murder (3 counts); Attempted murder
- Penalty: Death

Details
- Victims: 3–10
- Span of crimes: 2007–2013
- Country: Japan
- Date apprehended: 2014

Chisako Kakehi (筧千佐子, Kakehi Chisako; November 28, 1946 – December 26, 2024) was a Japanese serial killer who was sentenced to death for the murders of three men, including her husband, and for the attempted murder of a fourth. She was also suspected in at least seven other deaths.

== Arrest ==
Kakehi was arrested in 2014 following an autopsy on her fourth husband, Isao Kakehi, which revealed traces of cyanide poisoning.

== Trial ==
She initially pleaded not guilty, but during her 2017 trial, she confessed, stating that she had no intention of hiding her guilt and wanted to kill her husband out of "deep hatred"; two days later, she retracted this confession, claiming to not remember having said it. Her lawyers subsequently argued that she suffered from dementia and could not be convicted due to diminished responsibility.

In June 2021, the Supreme Court of Japan rejected her final appeal. One of the judges explained the decision based on Chisako's "ruthless crime(s) based on a planned and strong murderous intention."

== Death ==
Kakehi was incarcerated in Osaka. After being found unresponsive by prison staff on the morning of December 26, 2024, she was transported to hospital, where she died later the same day. She was 78.
