= The English Assassin (Silva novel) =

2002 spy novel by Daniel Silva

- First edition (US)
- Author: Daniel Silva
- Language: English
- Series: Gabriel Allon series
- Genre: Spy, thriller
- Publisher: G. P. Putnam's Sons (US); Penguin Books (UK)
- Publication date: 2002 (US); March 2002 (UK)
- Publication place: United States; United Kingdom
- Media type: Print (hardback & paperback)
- Pages: 386 (US); 400 (UK)
- ISBN: 0399148515 (US); 978-0-399-14851-4 (UK)
- Preceded by: The Kill Artist
- Followed by: The Confessor

The English Assassin is a 2002 spy novel by Daniel Silva.

It is the second book in the Gabriel Allon series.

== Plot summary ==
Art restorer, Gabriel Allon, who also works part-time for 'The Office', a semi-official Israeli intelligence agency, accepts an assignment from an anonymous Zurich banker. Arriving at his villa, he finds the man's murdered body. He flees the crime scene, but is arrested as he tries to leave the country. He is interrogated by Gerhardt Peterson, of Switzerland's internal security department, who accuses him of the murder of the deceased banker, Augustus Rolfe. But news of Gabriel's imprisonment has reached Israel, and Ari Shamron, Director of 'The Office', secures Gabriel's release. He reveals that Rolfe had expressed the desire to personally meet an agent from The Office to give them important information.

Gabriel travels to Portugal to meet Anna Rolfe, the estranged daughter of Augustus. She is a world-renowned violinist who lives in seclusion as she recovers from a major accident. She confesses that, unbeknownst to Swiss police, her father's assassin also stole his private art collection. Although Anna staunchly defends the provenance of those valuable paintings, Gabriel suspects that they were underhandedly acquired during World War II. Anna further adds that the Rolfe family's home and art collection were guarded by an elaborate security system designed by art dealer Werner Müller. Gabriel determines to meet Müller.

It is revealed that Peterson takes orders from the 'Council of Rütli', a secretive elite group of Swiss businessmen and bankers determined to protect the reputation of Switzerland and its (often stolen) riches. Otto Gessler, the highly secretive leader of the Council (whom Peterson has never seen), instructs Peterson to cut all links to the case—and to begin by killing Rolfe's art agent Werner Müller. Peterson contacts Don Orsati, a Corsican leader of organized crime, who assigns his best agent, the mysterious Englishman Christopher Keller, to fill Peterson's order.

Keller began his career in the SAS, and actually visited Israel, where he studied combat and intelligence techniques from members of the Office, including Allon. He was posted as 'missing believed killed' after a mission in Iraq, but in fact survived and became a freelance assassin, reaping a comfortable lifestyle. He lives in a Corsican village, becoming something of an adopted kinsman to the Orsati family and its self-proclaimed role as the arbitrators of justice.

Keller is instructed to bomb Müller's art store. Gabriel, who is visiting the store flees moments before the bomb detonates. He suffers substantial damage to his hands but escapes the crime scene unnoticed. Müller's death confirms that the missing art collection is the key to understanding Rolfe's murder.

Gabriel returns to England to plumb art dealer Julian Isherwood's extensive knowledge of the pillage of Jewish-owned art during the Second World War. Isherwood has first-hand knowledge of this topic since his father was an art dealer in Paris whose art works were also stolen. He warns that Swiss law protects its collectors who purportedly bought the art “in good faith” and have owned it for five years.

Isherwood refers Gabriel to the exiled Swiss Emil Jacobi, a historian, writer, and 'whistle blower' who contests the morality of Switzerland's acquisition and ownership of “looted” art. Jacobi confirms Isherwood's story and further accuses Rolfe of performing various services to the Nazi regime. He even conjectures that Rolfe allowed Jews to deposit their money in his bank and then turned over their information to the Gestapo. Jacobi relates that it was not uncommon for Nazi leaders to reward such informants with valuable property, including art. This seals Gabriel's resolve to research the provenance of Rolfe's art collection.

Anna admits that the provenance documents are in her father's desk. Gabriel returns to Zurich and discovers photographs of Rolfe with Nazi leaders Heinrich Himmler, Hermann Göring, and Adolf Hitler. Along with the pictures are bank account numbers and German names. He manages to escape with the documents and escapes with Anna. The latter now learns the truth about her father's suspicious activities—as well as her mother's suicide years earlier.

They return to Zurich, and manage to locate the bank that holds the security boxes. With the account number, they access two boxes. One contains a letter from Rolfe, anticipating his murder and explaining his guilt and his wish to return each painting to its rightful owner. The second box contains sixteen additional paintings, which they return to London. It emerges that one painting belonged to Julian Isherwood's father.

Anna is determined to accept a 'come-back' engagement to play in Venice. Gabriel and a specialist team guard her in case of an assassination attempt. The Englishman manages to evade the guards, but then deliberately does not carry out his assignment.

Gabriel's team kidnaps Gerhardt Peterson, and Gabriel brutally questions him about the activities of the Council. It emerges that Peterson had coordinated both Gabriel and Anna's planned murders, but Keller decided that he was killing for the wrong team. Gessler spearheaded the plan to murder Rolfe and steal his incriminating artwork. Gabriel determines to ask Gessler to exchange the confiscated art in return for its monetary value, but Peterson expresses scepticism that a wealthy man could be bribed with more money. The two journey to Gessler's luxurious and highly secure property, where Peterson turns on and imprisons Gabriel. After sustained beatings, Gessler takes him on a tour of his own private art collection—a vast museum housing hundreds of great paintings. The collection is ironic in that Gessler is blind; his satisfaction does not come from admiring the artwork but rather from possessing it. Gessler tells Gabriel to give up his quest, for Swiss law will never expose its own citizens. As the Council contemplates Gabriel's murder, Peterson helps Gabriel escape, citing his conscience and family's honour as motivations.

Several months later, Gabriel, still recovering from injuries sustained during his escape, has returned to his work at his home in Cornwall. Anna Rolfe has returned to her career as a violinist. Shamron decides that Gabriel should spend the next year as Anna's security detail.

Keller returns to Corsica to explain why he failed to assassinate Gabriel and Anna. He calls upon the Orsati family's long-standing tradition of honour killing and states that justice demands the life of Otto Gessler, not Gabriel or Anna. Orsati worries that Keller will not enjoy Gabriel's lucky escape, but Keller insists that he is now a better agent than Gabriel. Indeed, Keller does breach Gessler's security, fatally stabs him, and departs unscathed. Peterson is also found dead as a result of an 'accident'.

== Background ==
According to an interview with Silva, Gabriel Allon was initially to be "a 'one off' character." Beyond being "too melancholy and withdrawn", his nationality and religion were the biggest concern.

== Critical reception ==
Publishers Weekly called The English Assassin a "superbly crafted thriller." However, other reviews were less glowing. Thom Geier writing for Entertainment Weekly gave the novel a "C" rating. Geier noted that "Silva's plotting is as sophisticated as paint-by-numbers" and that his novel suffers from "sloppily written descriptions." Critic Michael Harris of the Los Angeles Times cited the lack of character development as an example of "how Silva's work has declined since his notable debut" and described the character of Gabriel Allon as "a robot who, when shot or stabbed, is as likely to leak hydraulic fluid as blood."

== Sources ==
- Silva, Daniel. The English Assassin. Signet: 2003, 416 pages.

== International titles ==
- Silva, Daniel (2009). O Assassino Inglês [The English Assassin] (in Portuguese). ISBN 9789722518574. OCLC 660610125.
