= The Procuress =

The Procuress may refer to:

== Paintings ==
- The Procuress (Cranach), 1548
- The Procuress (Aachen), 1605–1610
- The Procuress (Dirck van Baburen), c. 1622
- The Procuress (Honthorst), 1625
- The Procuress (Vermeer), 1656
- The Procuress (Fragonard), 1770
- The Procuress (Turner), 1828

== Other uses ==
- The Procuress, a fictional character in Du Shiniang, played by Jin Yaqin, 1981
