= Prometheus Being Chained by Vulcan =

Painting by Dirck van Baburen

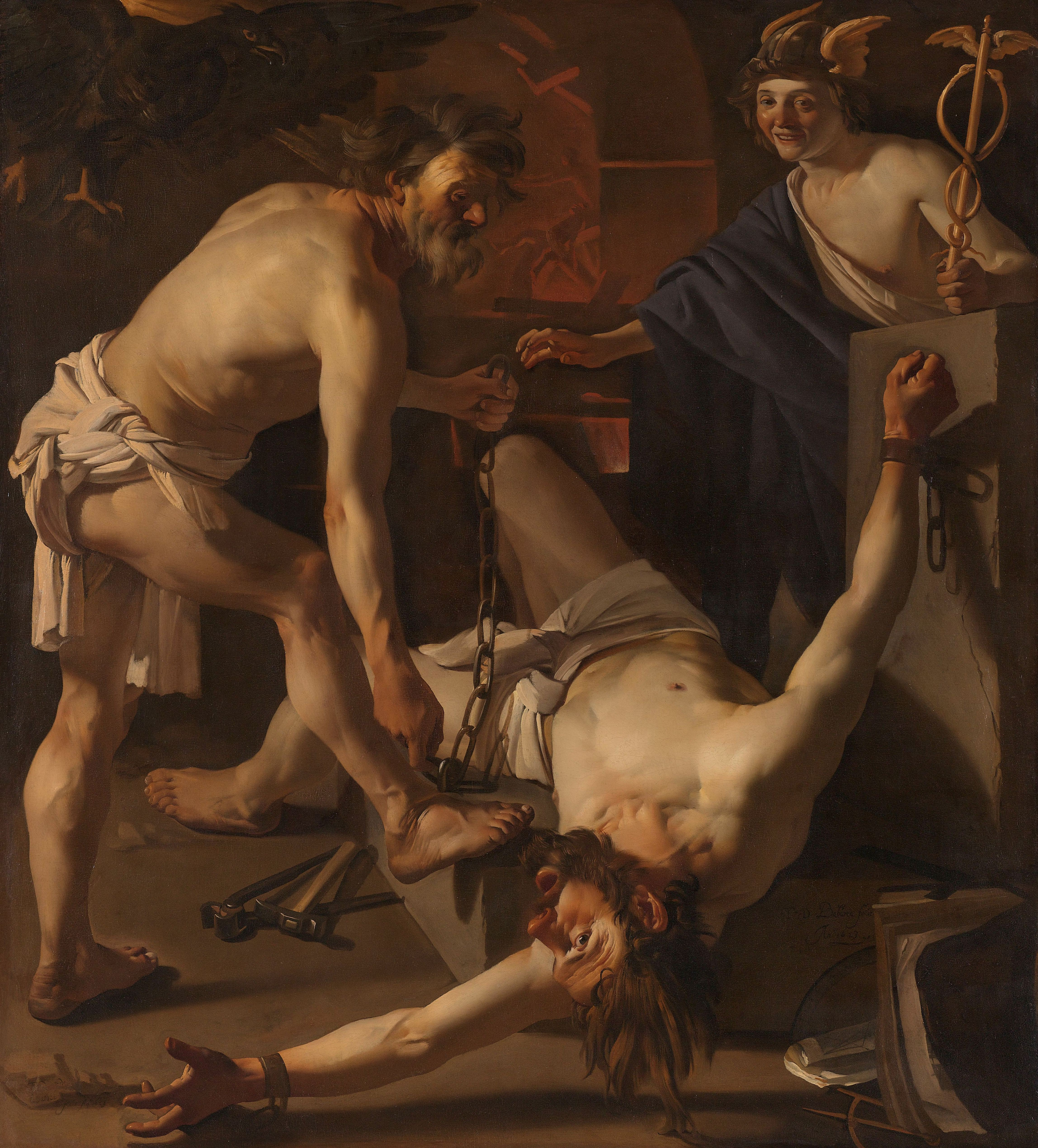
- Artist: Dirck van Baburen
- Year: 1623
- Medium: Oil on canvas
- Dimensions: 202 cm × 184 cm (80 in × 72 in)
- Location: Rijksmuseum; Amsterdam

Prometheus Being Chained by Vulcan is an oil painting of 1623 by Dirck van Baburen of the Utrecht School, and an example of Baroque chiaroscuro.

The painting represents a tale from Greco-Roman mythology. Mercury, the messenger of the gods, watches the club-footed blacksmith god, Vulcan, punish the bold and cunning Titan Prometheus for stealing fire from the gods and giving it to mortals. Prometheus's punishment is to be bound to a rock and to have his liver consumed daily by an eagle, which appears partially at the top left.

The painting mysteriously has two signatures: the first is a clear signature below the right-hand shoulder of Prometheus. During a restoration of the painting, a second signature was discovered at the lower left by his hand.

In some versions of a Greek creation myth, Prometheus forges humans from clay and the stolen fire brings them to life. A painting, Adam and Eve, also by Baburen, was sold at auction in 1707 together with the Prometheus Being Chained by Vulcan, and one might conjecture that the two works formed a pair, both being illustrations of creation.
