= Pietro Cussida =

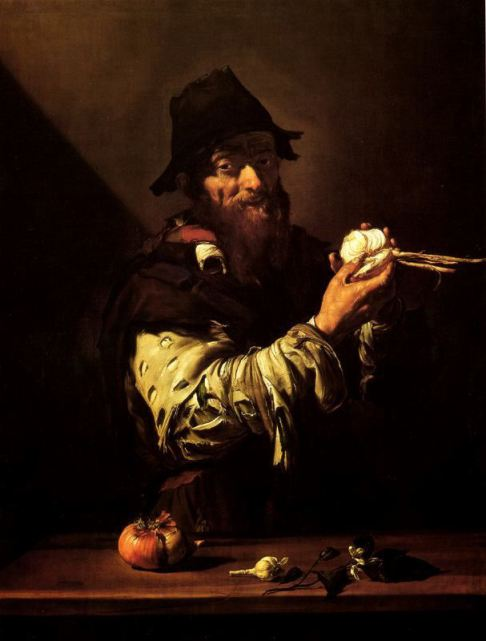
Jusepe de Ribera, Allegory of Smell (1615/16), oil on canvas, 115 x 88 cm, Juan Abelló Collection, Madrid

Pietro Cussida, Pietro Cuside or Pedro Cossida (died October 1622) was a Spanish diplomat in the service of Philip III of Spain and his successor, Philip IV. He was an art collector and patron, known for his patronage of Caravaggisti artists, including Jusepe de Ribera and Dirck van Baburen.

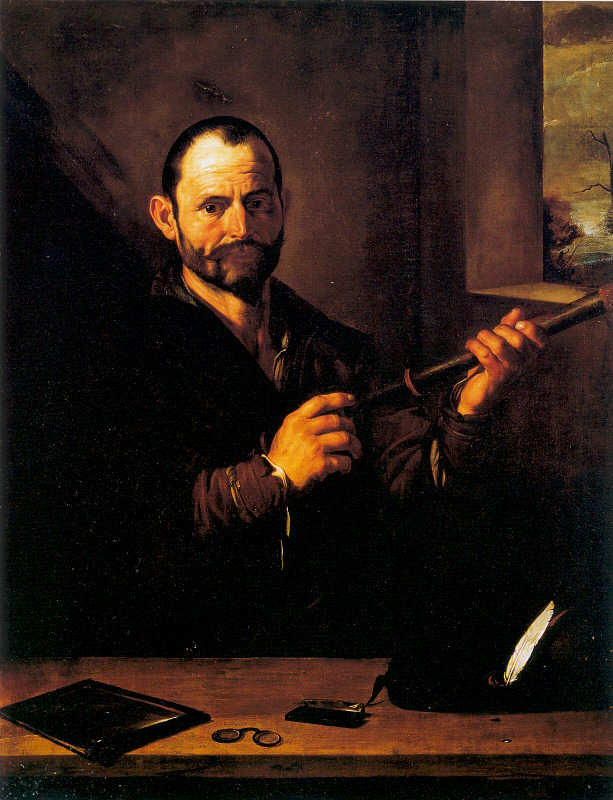
Jusepe de Ribera, Allegory of Sight (1615/16), oil on canvas, Museo Franz Mayer, Mexico City, Mexico

== Biography ==
Originally from Zaragoza, Cussida was in Rome by at least 1596, when he is a regular customer of the bank Herrera & Costa. He is known to have had a wife, Giulia Martinez, by whom he had two sons, Gianfrancesco (or Giovan Francesco) and Luigi, who became a Carmelite friar. By 1602 he was serving as diplomat in the service of Philip III (ruled 1598-1621) and then Philip IV (ruled 1621-1665). One of his duties was the procurement of art work for the kings.

Pietro Cussida died in Rome in October 1622. He had gained a remarkable collection of paintings, which he left, along with his palace on the Via del Corso to Gianfrancesco, who died on 23 August 1623 and left the collection to his daughter Laura Cussida (1622-1692), a minor. Laura's guardian, Nicolò Gavotti, eventually inherited the paintings and the family palazzo.

== Art collection ==
It was through Cussida's patronage that Van Baburan painted the Entombment, Christ in the Garden of Gethsemane and Christ on the Road to Calvary for the Chapel of the Pietà of the Church of San Pietro in Montorio. Van Baburen shared the commission (ca. 1617) with David de Haen, who is now believed to have done the lunettes in the Chapel. De Haen was a guest at the Cussida palazzo on the Via del Corso in 1621.

Between 1615 and 1616, he commissioned Jusepe de Ribera to paint allegories of the Five Senses, a commission Ribera probably completed in Naples.

It was the discovery of the 8 March 1624 inventory of Gianfrancesco Cussida (Archivio Storico Capitolino, Rome), Cussida's son, that led to the attribution of the works to Ribera that had previously been thought to be by the Master of the Judgement of Solomon.

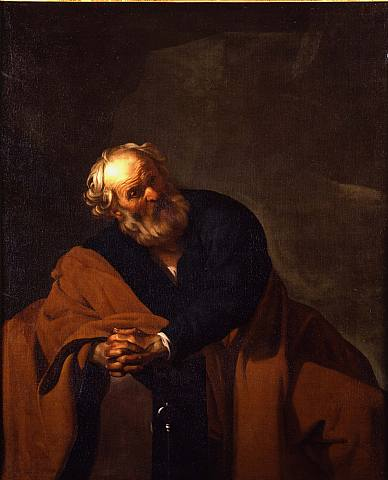
Dirck van Baburen, Saint Peter, oil on canvas, 165 x 137 cm, placed in the 1624 inventory.
