= Woman Playing a Guitar (Vouet) =

Painting by Simon Vouet

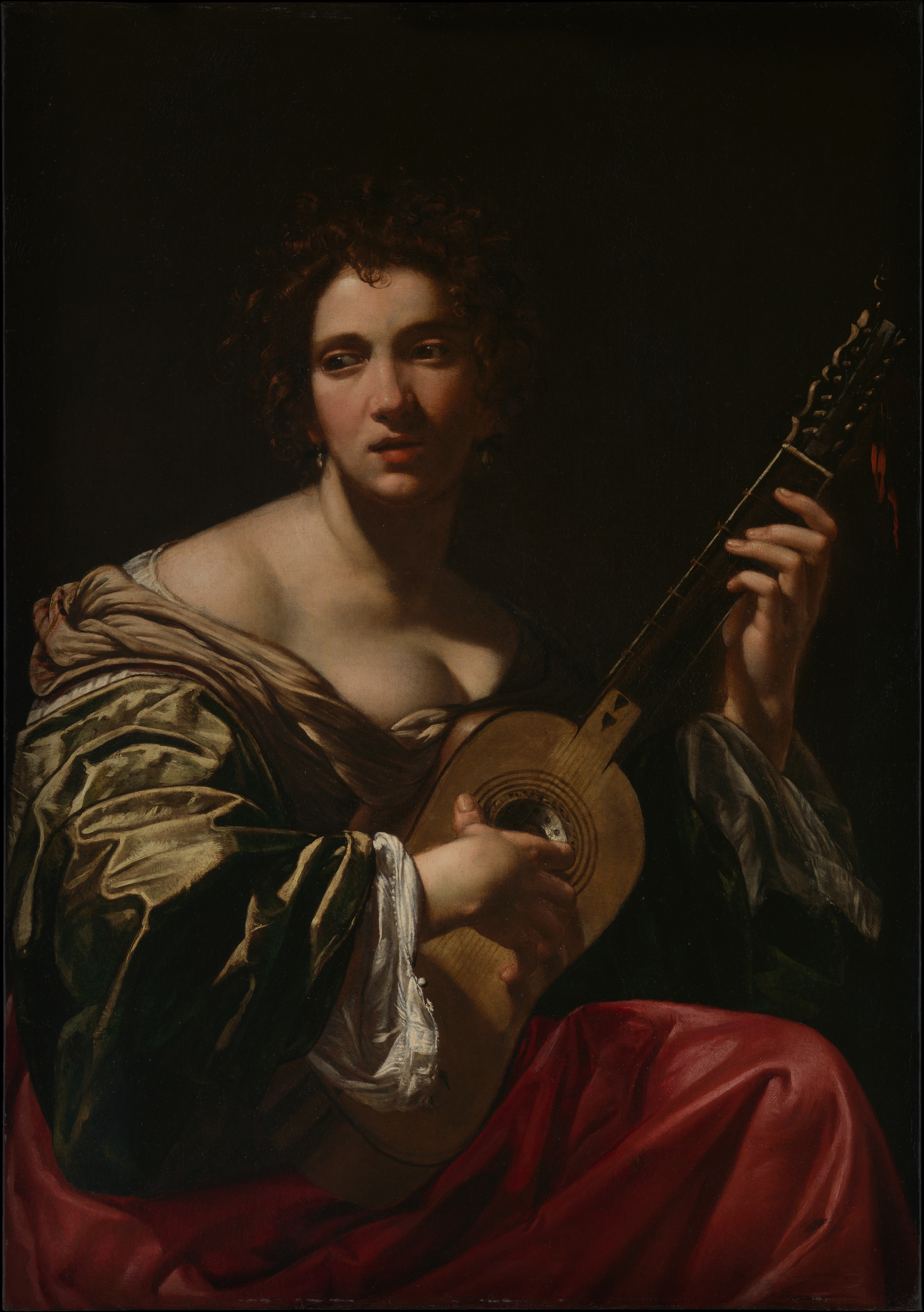
- Artist: Simon Vouet
- Year: c. 1618
- Medium: Oil on canvas
- Dimensions: 106.5 cm × 75.8 cm (41.9 in × 29.8 in)
- Location: Metropolitan Museum of Art; New York
- Accession: 2017.242

Woman Playing a Guitar is an oil-on-canvas painting by French artist Simon Vouet, executed c. 1618. The painting is in tenebrist style and depicts a finely dresses woman distractedly playing a guitar. The work is in the collection of the Metropolitan Museum of Art in New York.

== Description ==
Woman Playing a Guitar depicts a satin-garbed women playing a guitar, a subject that was common in 17th-century European art. The woman is seen gazing at into space, and is described by the Met as being "lost in reverie". Sources have also commented on the subject's sumptuous dress.

The work was painted by Simon Vouet while he was living in Rome. It was painted for a private collector, and the Metropolitan Museum of Art speculates that the work may have once been in the collection of Palazzo Patrizi.
