= The Procuress (Vermeer) =

1656 painting by Johannes Vermeer

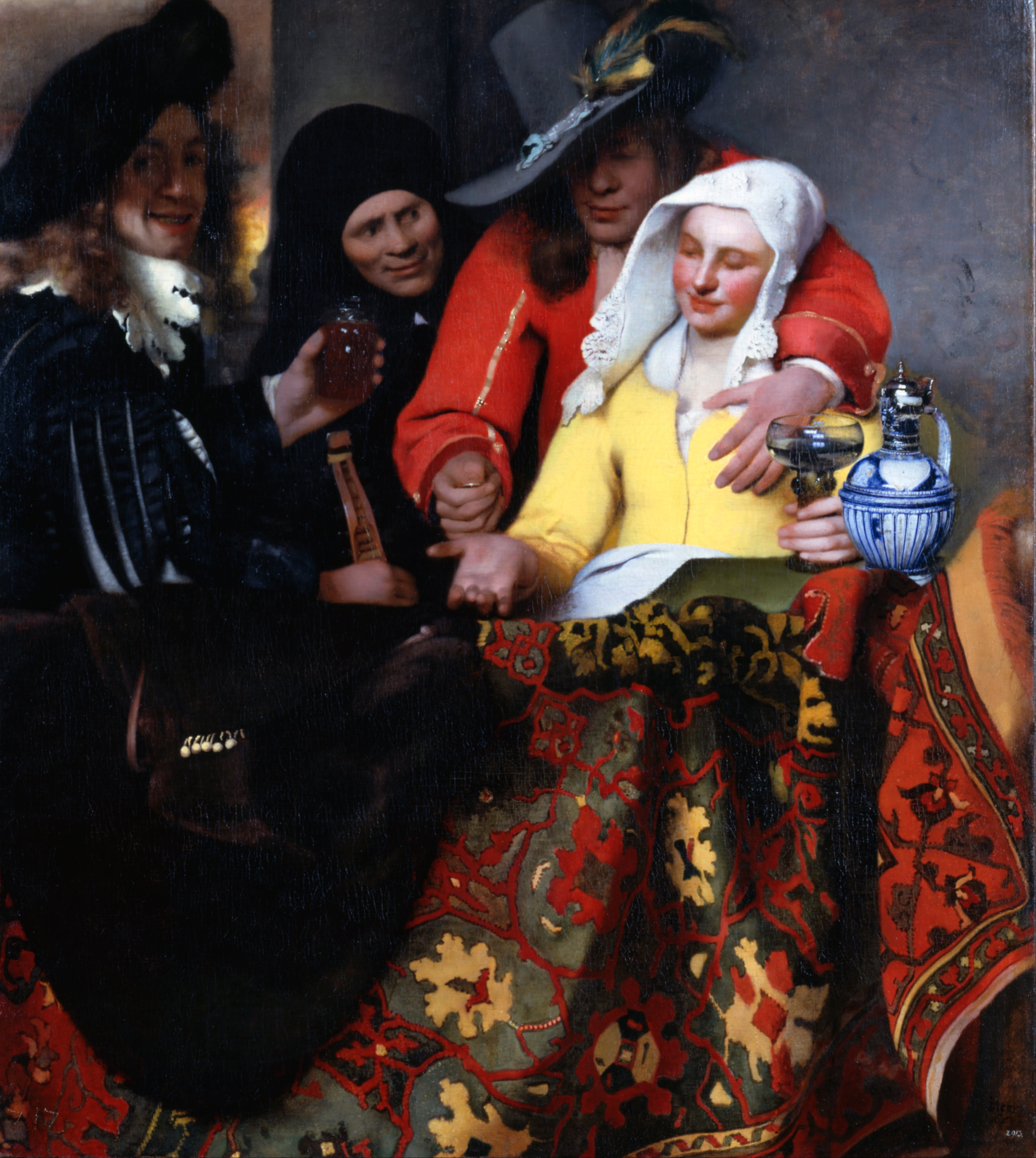
- Artist: Johannes Vermeer
- Year: 1656
- Medium: Oil on canvas
- Movement: Dutch Golden Age painting
- Dimensions: 143 cm × 130 cm (56 in × 51 in)
- Location: Gemäldegalerie Alte Meister, Dresden

The Procuress (Dutch: De koppelaarster) is a 1656 oil-on-canvas painting by the then 24-year-old Johannes Vermeer. It can be seen in the Gemäldegalerie Alte Meister in Dresden. It is his first genre painting and shows a scene of contemporary life, an image of mercenary love perhaps in a brothel. It differs from his earlier biblical and mythological scenes. It is one of only three paintings Vermeer signed and dated (the other two are The Astronomer and The Geographer). In 1696 the painting, being sold at an auction in Amsterdam, was named "A merry company in a room".

The woman in black, the leering coupler, "in a nun's costume", could be the eponymous procuress, while the man to her right, "wearing a black beret and a doublet with slashed sleeves", has been identified as a self-portrait of the artist; there is a resemblance with the painter in Vermeer's The Art of Painting.

It seems Vermeer was influenced by earlier works on the same subject by Gerard ter Borch, and The Procuress (c. 1622) by Dirck van Baburen, which was owned by Vermeer's mother-in-law Maria Thins and hung in her home. Some critics thought the painting is atypical of Vermeer's style and expression, because it lacks the typical light. Pieter Swillens wrote in 1950 that—if the work was by Vermeer at all—it showed the artist "seeking and groping" to find a suitable mode of expression. Eduard Trautscholdt wrote 10 years before that "The temperament of the 24-year-old Vermeer fully emerges for the first time".

The jug on the oriental rug is a piece of Westerwald Pottery. The kelim thrown over a banister, probably produced in Uşak, covers a third of the painting and shows medallions and leaves. The instrument is probably a cittern. The dark coat with five buttons was added by Vermeer in a later stage. The man in the red jacket, a soldier, is fondling the young woman's breast and dropping a coin into her outstretched hand.

According to Benjamin Binstock, this "dark and gloomy" painting could be understood as a psychological portrait of his adopted family and does not represent a didactic message. Binstock says Vermeer used his family as models; the procuress could be Vermeer's wife Catherina and the lewd soldier her brother Willem.

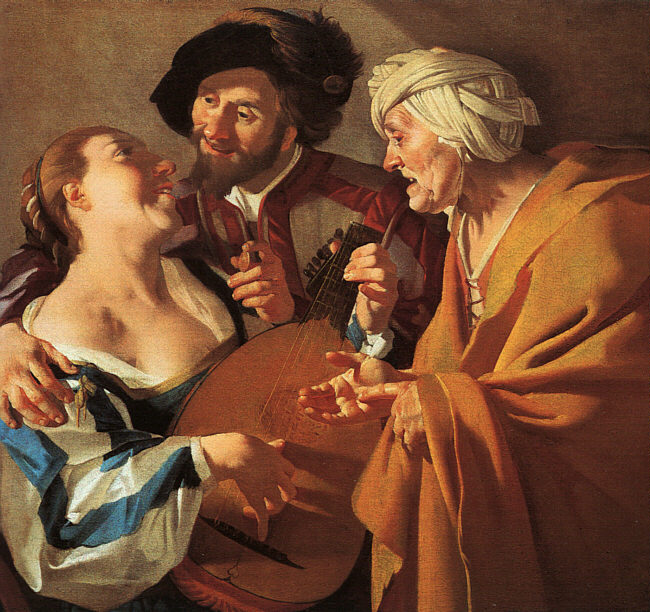
Dirck van Baburen, The Procuress, 1622, oil on canvas, Museum of Fine Arts, Boston. The painting was owned by Maria Thins, mother-in-law of Johannes Vermeer, who reproduced it within two of his own paintings.

== Provenance and exhibitions ==
The painting was in the Waldstein collection in Dux (now Duchcov), then bought in 1741 for August III of Poland, the Elector of Saxony.

The painting was exhibited in 1980 at the Restaurierte Kunstwerke in der Deutschen Demokratischen Republic exhibit in the Staatliche Museen zu Berlin, Altes Museum.

This painting should not be confused with another painting by the same name, by Dirck van Baburen, nor with a fake version once attributed to Vermeer, of which technical analysis in 2011 revealed that there is Bakelite in the paint, definitively proving that the painting is a modern forgery. It was most probably executed by the notorious forger, Han van Meegeren, who was responsible for producing several fake Vermeers and known to use said resin to harden the paint.

== Painting materials ==
The technical investigation of this painting was done in 1968 by Hermann Kühn. The pigment analysis revealed Vermeer's use of his usual pigments such as ultramarine in the blue wine jug and lead-tin-yellow in the jacket of the woman. He also employed smalt in the green parts of the tablecloth and in the greenish background which is less usual for him.

== See also ==
- List of paintings by Johannes Vermeer
