= The Concert (Vermeer) =

Stolen painting by Johannes Vermeer c. 1664

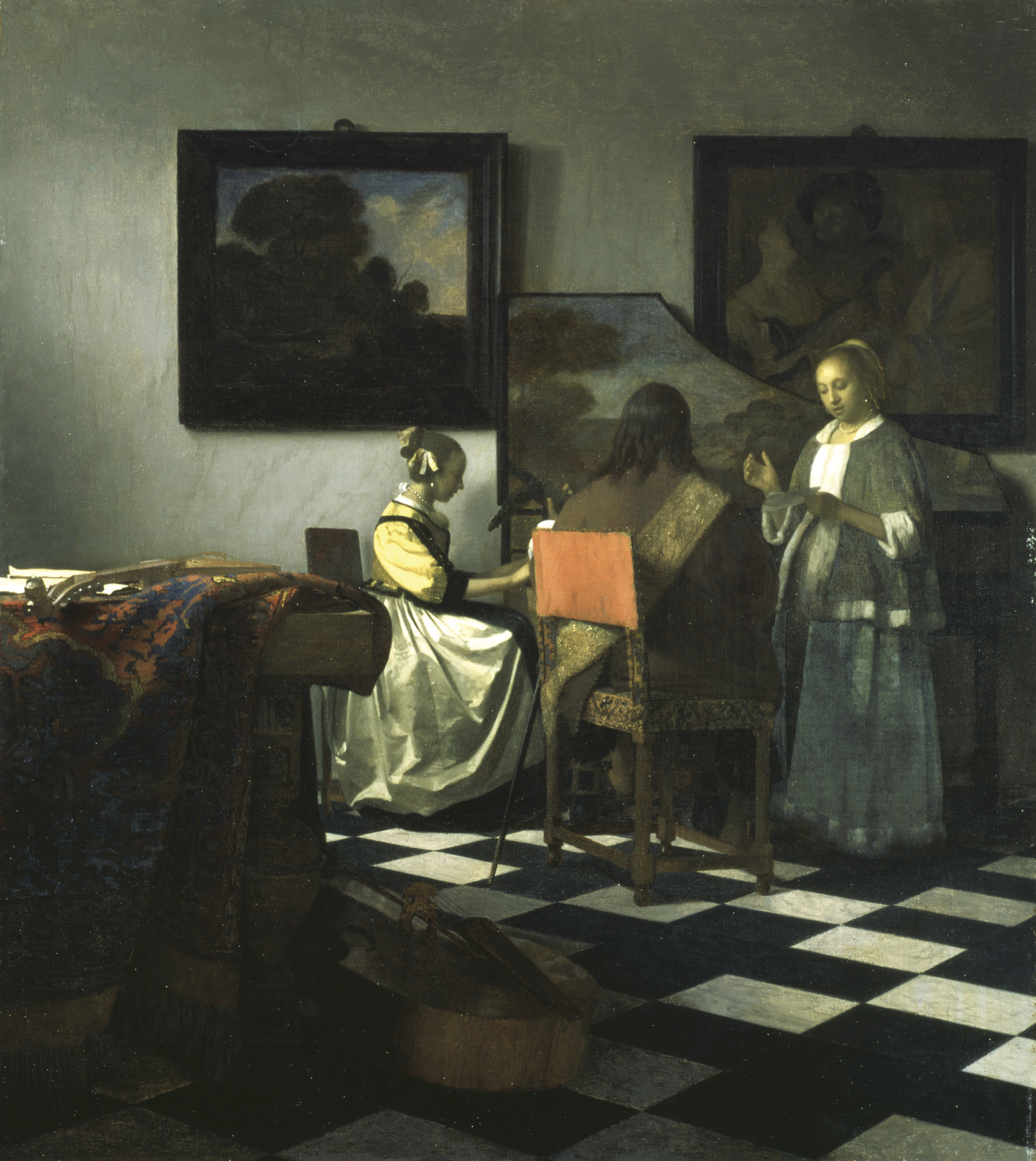
- Artist: Johannes Vermeer
- Year: circa 1664
- Medium: Oil on canvas
- Movement: Dutch Golden Age painting
- Dimensions: 72.5 cm × 64.7 cm (28.5 in × 25.5 in)
- Location: Whereabouts unknown since the Isabella Stewart Gardner Museum theft in 1990

The Concert (Dutch: Het concert) (c. 1664) is a painting by the Dutch artist Johannes Vermeer depicting a man and two women performing music. It was stolen on March 18, 1990, from the Isabella Stewart Gardner Museum in Boston and remains missing to the present.

== History ==
Although The Concert has been dated stylistically to the mid-1660s, it is first documented only in 1780. It was acquired by Isabella Stewart Gardner in an 1892 auction in Paris for $5,000 and subsequently displayed in the Isabella Stewart Gardner Museum. On the night of March 18, 1990, thieves disguised as policemen stole 13 works from the museum, including The Concert. To this day the painting has not resurfaced; it is thought to be the most valuable work currently unrecovered, with a value estimated at US$250 million.

== Description ==
The picture measures 28.5 by 25.5 inches (72.5 by 64.7 centimetres) and shows three musicians: a young woman sitting at a harpsichord, a man playing the lute, and a woman who is singing. The harpsichord's upturned lid is decorated with an Arcadian landscape; its bright coloring stands in contrast to the two paintings hanging on the wall to the right and left. A viola da gamba can be seen lying on the floor. The musicians' clothing and surroundings identify them as members of the upper bourgeoisie. The male lute player, for instance, wears a shoulder belt and a sword. Despite its simplicity, the black and white marble flooring is luxurious and expensive.

Of the two paintings in the background, the one on the right is The Procuress by Dirck Van Baburen (c. 1622), which belonged to Vermeer's mother-in-law, Maria Thins. The work also appears in his Lady Seated at a Virginal, probably painted some six years after The Concert. The painting on the left is a wild pastoral landscape. The musical theme in Dutch painting in Vermeer's time often connoted love and seduction, but in this case the feeling is more ambiguous. Although the presence of Van Baburen's sexually exuberant picture suggests such an interpretation, its function may be to provide a contrast with the actual domestic situation. In the same way, the peaceful scenes depicted on the harpsichord contrast with the wild landscape painting on the wall.

== Other arts ==
Even before the actual robbery, the theft of this painting was the subject of a 1964 episode of The Alfred Hitchcock Hour called "Ten Minutes from Now". Following the real theft, the stolen painting has figured in the novels Death at the Sign of the Rook (2024) by Kate Atkinson; An Object of Beauty (2010) by Steve Martin; The Medusa Plot (2011) by Gordon Korman; and The Collector (2023) by Daniel Silva. In addition, in Tracy Chevalier's historical novel Girl with a Pearl Earring (1999), Vermeer paints The Concert at the same time that he is painting Girl with a Pearl Earring, an event also portrayed in the 2003 film adaptation.

== See also ==
- List of paintings by Johannes Vermeer
- List of stolen paintings
