= Adam de Coster =

17th-century Flemish painter

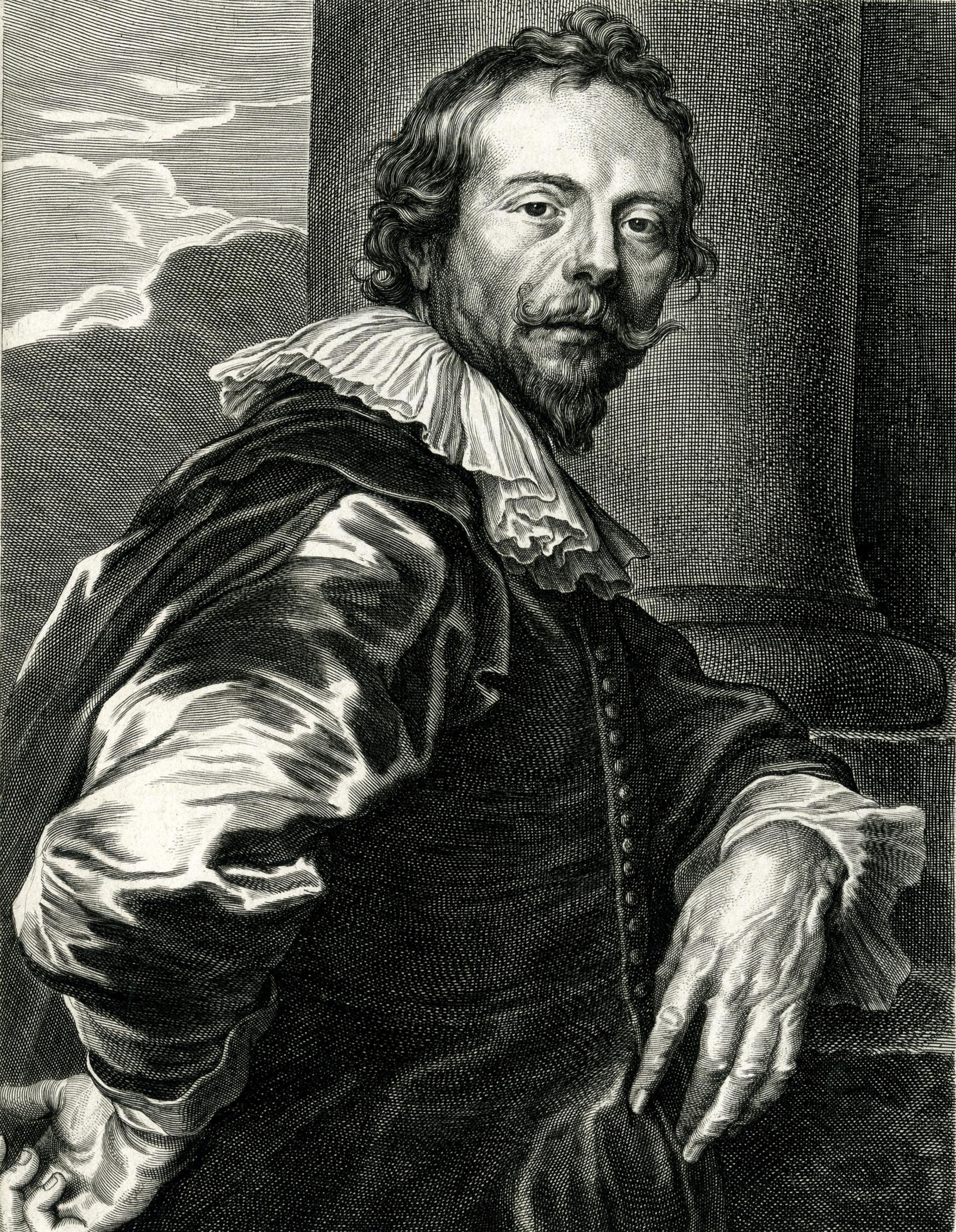
Adam de Coster by Pieter de Jode II after Anthony van Dyck

Adam de Coster (c. 1586 in Mechelen – 4 May 1643 in Antwerp) was a Flemish painter. He was a prominent member of the Antwerp Caravaggisti. These Caravaggisti were part of an international movement of European artists who interpreted the work of Caravaggio and the followers of Caravaggio in a personal manner. He is mainly known for his genre scenes with strong chiaroscuro effects. He was called a Pictor Noctium (English: 'Painter of Nights') because of his preference for tenebrist scenes.

== Life ==
Details about the life and training of Adam de Coster are sketchy. It is known he was originally from Mechelen where he was born in the year 1585 or 1586 as the son of Jan de Coster and Clara van der Borcht. In 1607 he is recorded in Antwerp on his admission as a master in the local Guild of Saint Luke.

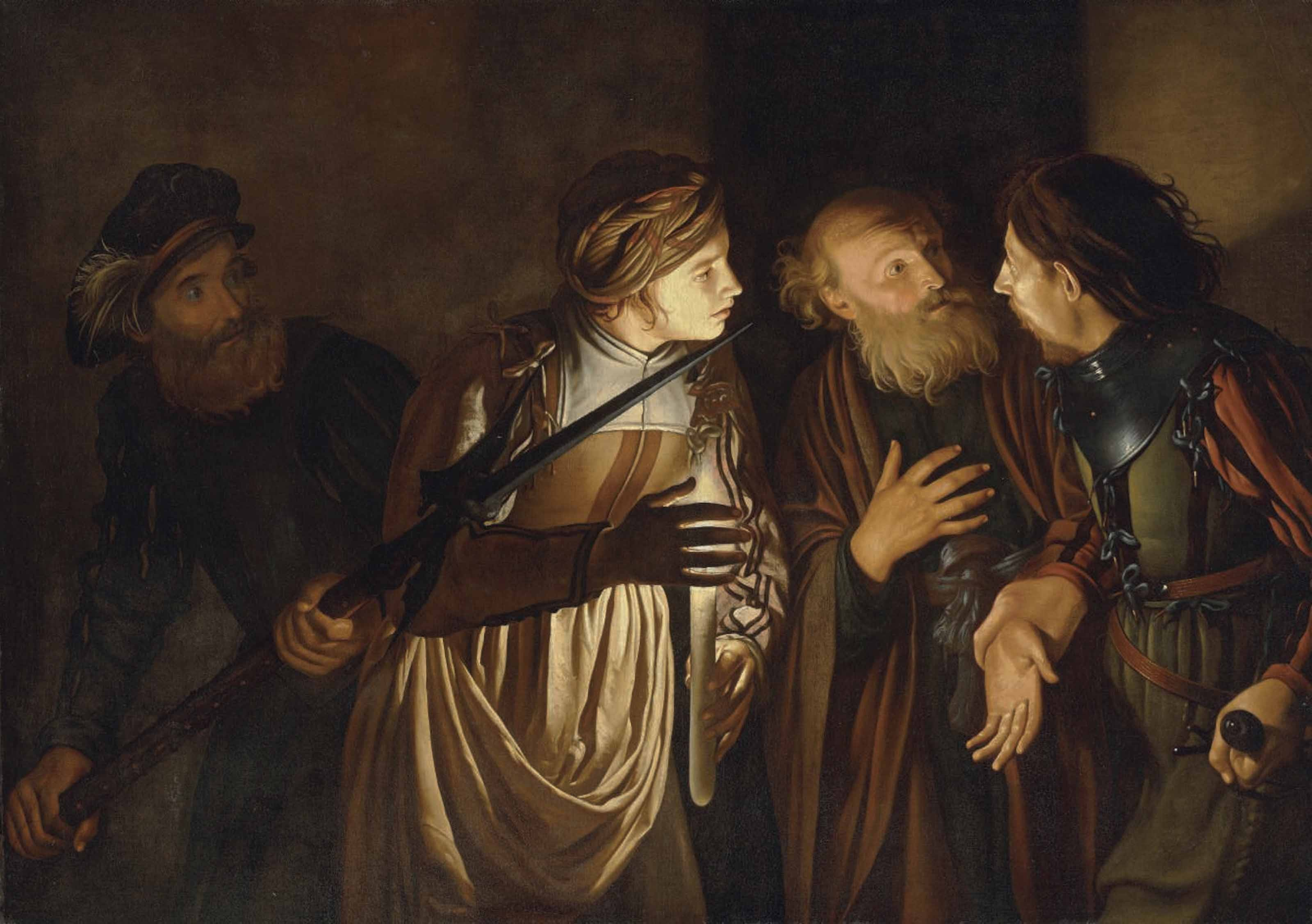
The Denial of Saint Peter

Despite the lack of documentary evidence, it is assumed that de Coster travelled to Italy in his formative years. Here he would have been in touch with the works of Caravaggio and his followers, which would have such an important influence on his style and subject matter. Some of the recently rediscovered works of de Coster were part of Italian collections, which also points to a possible residence in Italy. Certain correspondences between his paintings and those of the Lombard artist Antonio Campi also point to a possible sojourn in Italy. The only evidence for any foreign travel is a document which places him in Hamburg in 1635. De Coster did have strong personal ties with Italy as some of his close relatives emigrated to Italy where they worked as painters.

He spent his active career in Antwerp where he seems to have enjoyed a high reputation. This is confirmed by the fact that Anthony van Dyck painted his Portrait in grisaille and an engraving freely cut after this portrait by Pieter de Jode II was included in van Dyck's "Iconography" (Icones Principum Virorum), a collection of portraits of leading personalities of van Dyck's time. Below his portrait de Coster is described as a Pictor Noctium i.e. a 'Painter of Nights', a clear reference to his preference for tenebrist scenes. It demonstrates that his reputation as a painter of night scenes had been established firmly in Northern Europe by the 1630s.

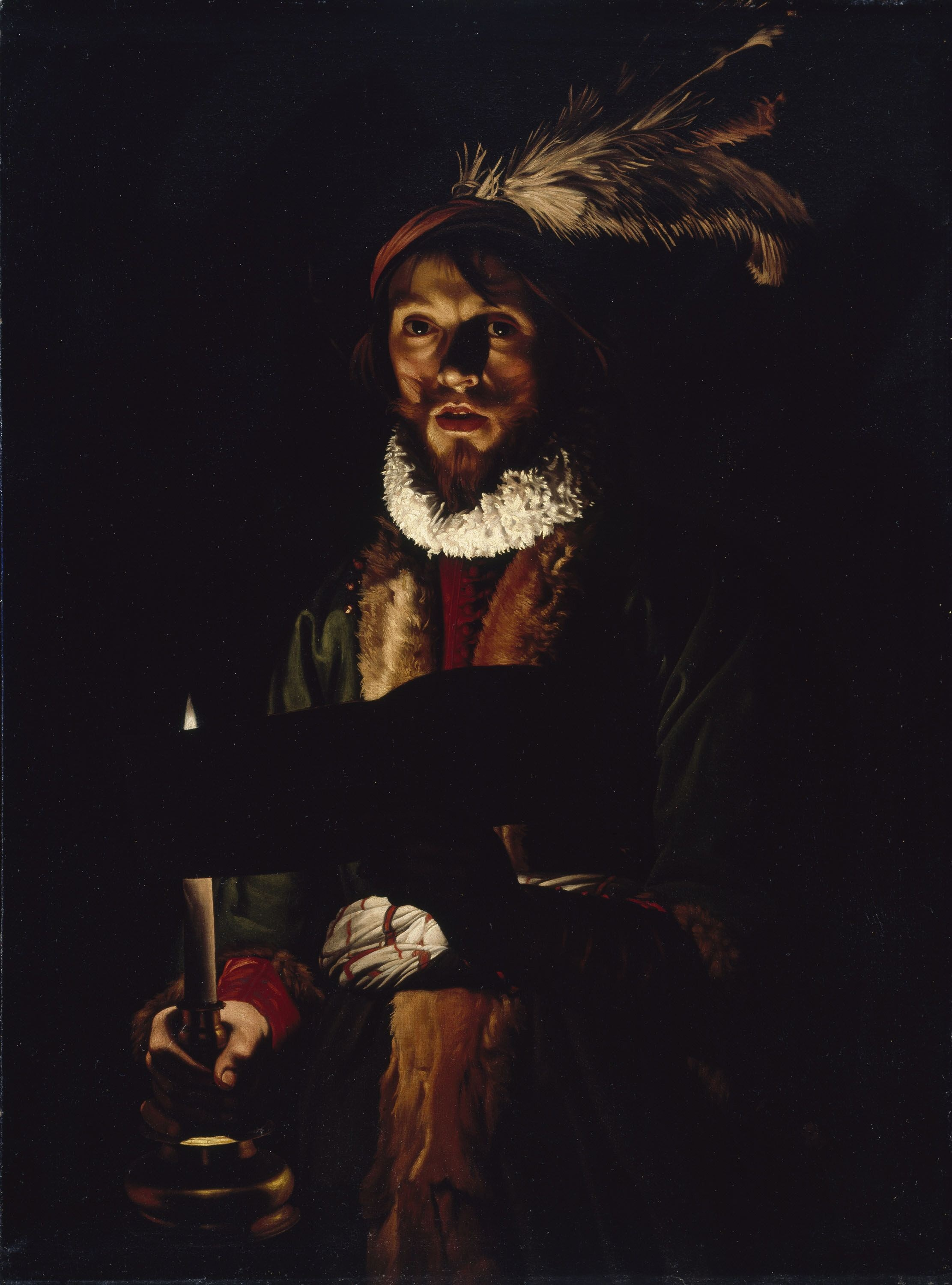
A man singing by candlelight

The artist did not have any known pupils. His name was largely forgotten after his death and his work attributed to other artists.

== Work ==
Adam de Coster was not in the habit of signing or dating his works. As a result, many of his works were attributed to other Caravaggisti. His oeuvre has been reconstituted mainly on the basis of an engraving made by Lucas Vorsterman the Elder (1595–1675) after the lost painting Backgammon or Tric-trac players by candle light. The engraving depicted tric-trac players and a musician illuminated by two burning candles on a table. The engraving states in the lower margin: "A De Coster pi:", which shows that it was engraved after an original work by de Coster. This work provided the basis for the attribution of further paintings. The English art historian Benedict Nicolson played an important role in the rediscovery of the artist and the re-attribution of works to de Coster.

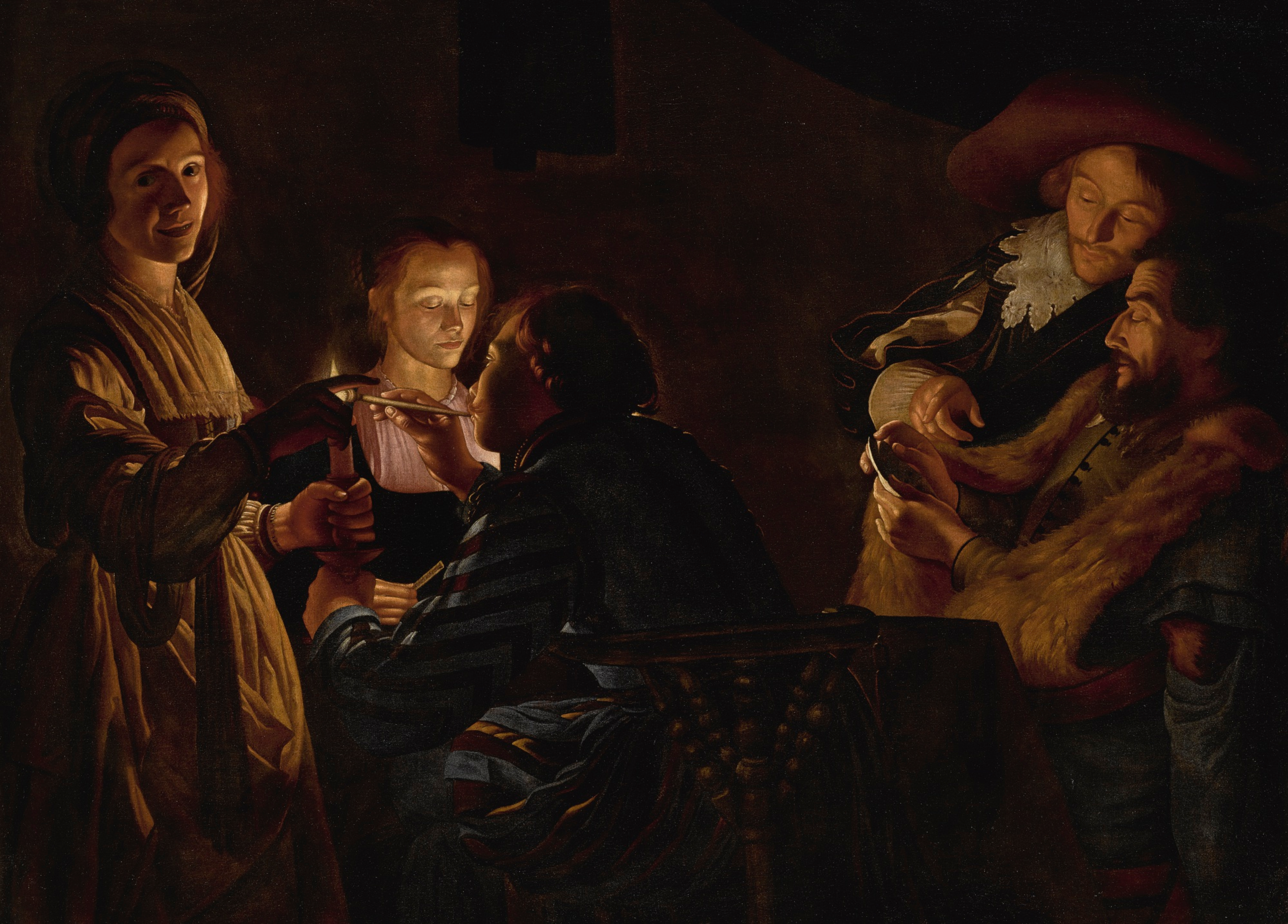
Card Players

Adam de Coster's oeuvre is mainly composed of genre paintings with half-length figures and dramatic light effects. He preferred stark chiaroscuro and returned time and again to the motif of half-length figures illuminated by candlelight. He was clearly familiar with the work of Caravaggio and his followers and in particular the Utrecht Caravaggists. De Coster's paintings show a certain affinity with those of Georges de La Tour and other French variations of the tenebrist movement in Caravaggism. More direct influences, however, are Gerard Honthorst and Antonio Campi. He often used the trope of the half-masked flame in his compositions.

His subjects are those that one typically finds with Caravaggio and his followers: card sharps, fortune tellers, prostitutes, musical performances, the denial of St Peter etc. De Coster returned to certain themes regularly and various versions of the Denial of St Peter and the Card Players exist. He also painted Two Sculptors at Night in Rome (Statens Museum for Kunst), which is possibly a double portrait of Francois Duquesnoy and Georg Petel. This suggests he was also active as a portrait painter.

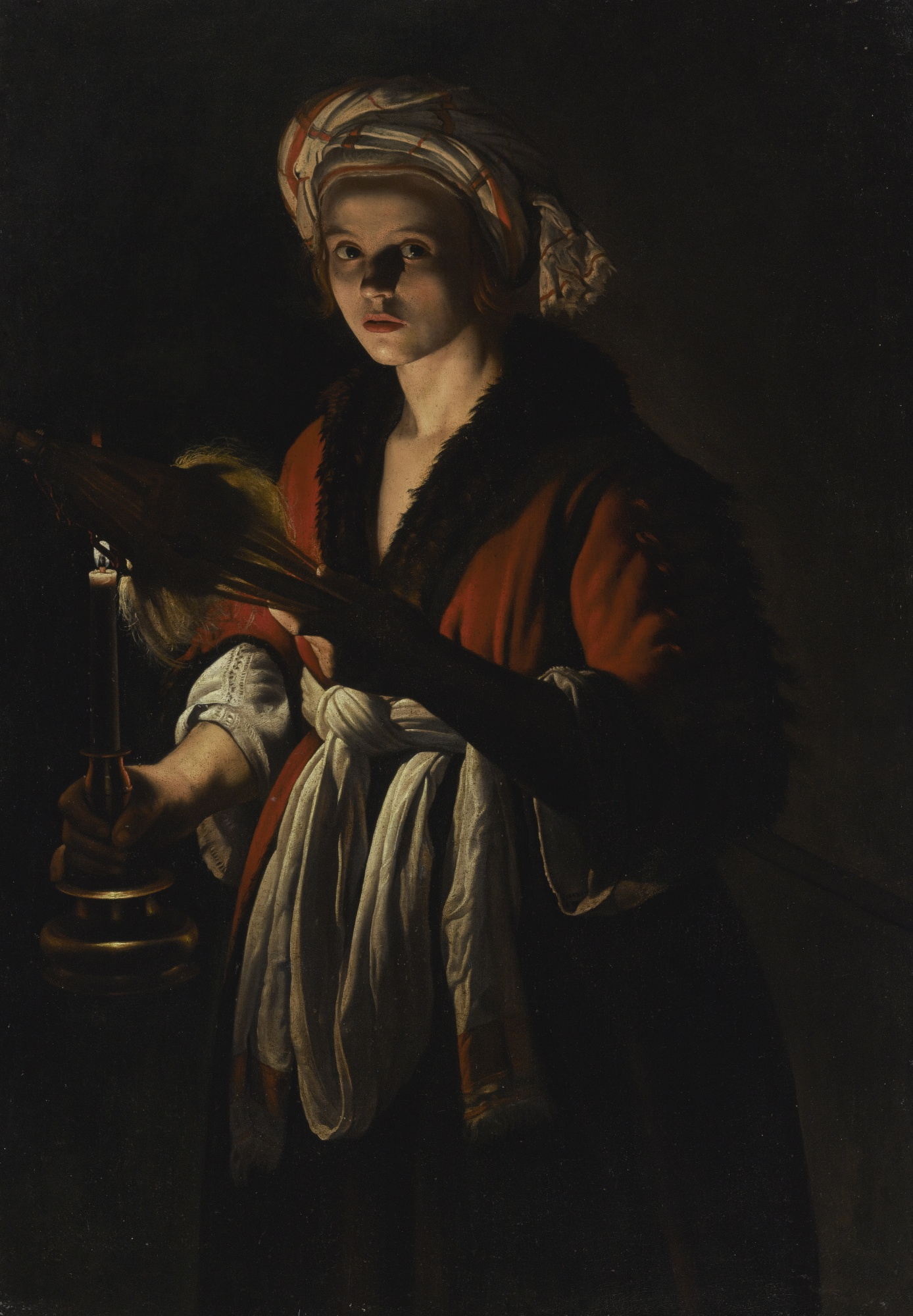
Young woman holding a distaff before a lit candle

A fine example of his work is the Three Singers (Liechtenstein Collections). In this work de Coster depicts a musical performance by three singers who are singing from the same songbook. The three musicians are drawn with fine yet sharp features, against the background of a red curtain. They are illuminated from below by a source of light outside the picture. De Coster shows his mastery in the sensuous rendering of the fabric of the female singer's dress and the way it catches the light. Another composition with a musical theme is A Man Singing by Candlelight (1625–1635) (National Gallery of Ireland). Here de Coster used the device of the covered light source to create splendid lighting effects on the costume. The singer is depicted with half-open mouth heightening the sense of drama and the realism of a captured moment in time. It is likely that the figure is a life study. Closely related to this work is A young woman holding a distaff before a lit candle (At Sotheby's 25 January 2017 in New York, lot 23), another composition depicting a single figure lit by the flame of what appears to be the same candle stick. The similarities between the two compositions illustrates de Coster's reworking of a successful compositional prototype.
