= The Lute Player (Dirck van Baburen) =

1622 painting by Dirck van Baburen

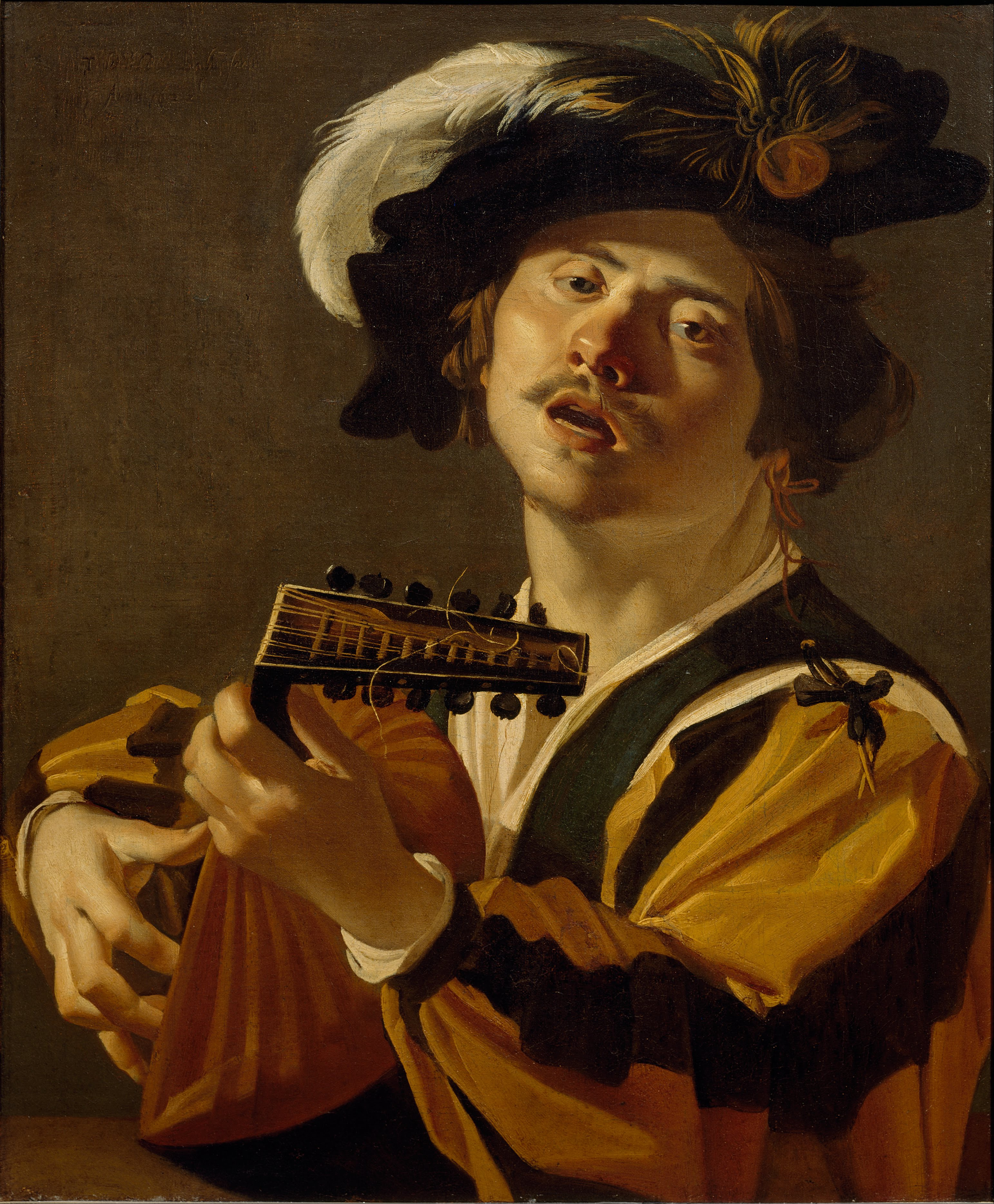
The Lute Player (1622) by Dirck van Baburen

The Lute Player or Singing Man with Lute is a 1622 oil-on-canvas painting by Dirck van Baburen. Since 1955 it has been in the Centraal Museum in Utrecht.

Having encountered Caravaggio's style in Rome, van Baburen popularised it back in the Dutch Republic, particularly images of single musicians such as this one, drawing on the Italian artist's The Lute Player and setting a trend which also resulted in Frans Hals's The Lute Player of 1623.

== Bibliography ==
- (in Dutch) Anna Tummers (ed.), Frans Hals, Oog in oog met Rembrandt, Rubens en Titiaan Frans Hals Museum, Haarlem, 2013 p. 112
