= The Procuress (Dirck van Baburen) =

Number of similar paintings by the Dutch Golden Age painter Dirck van Baburen

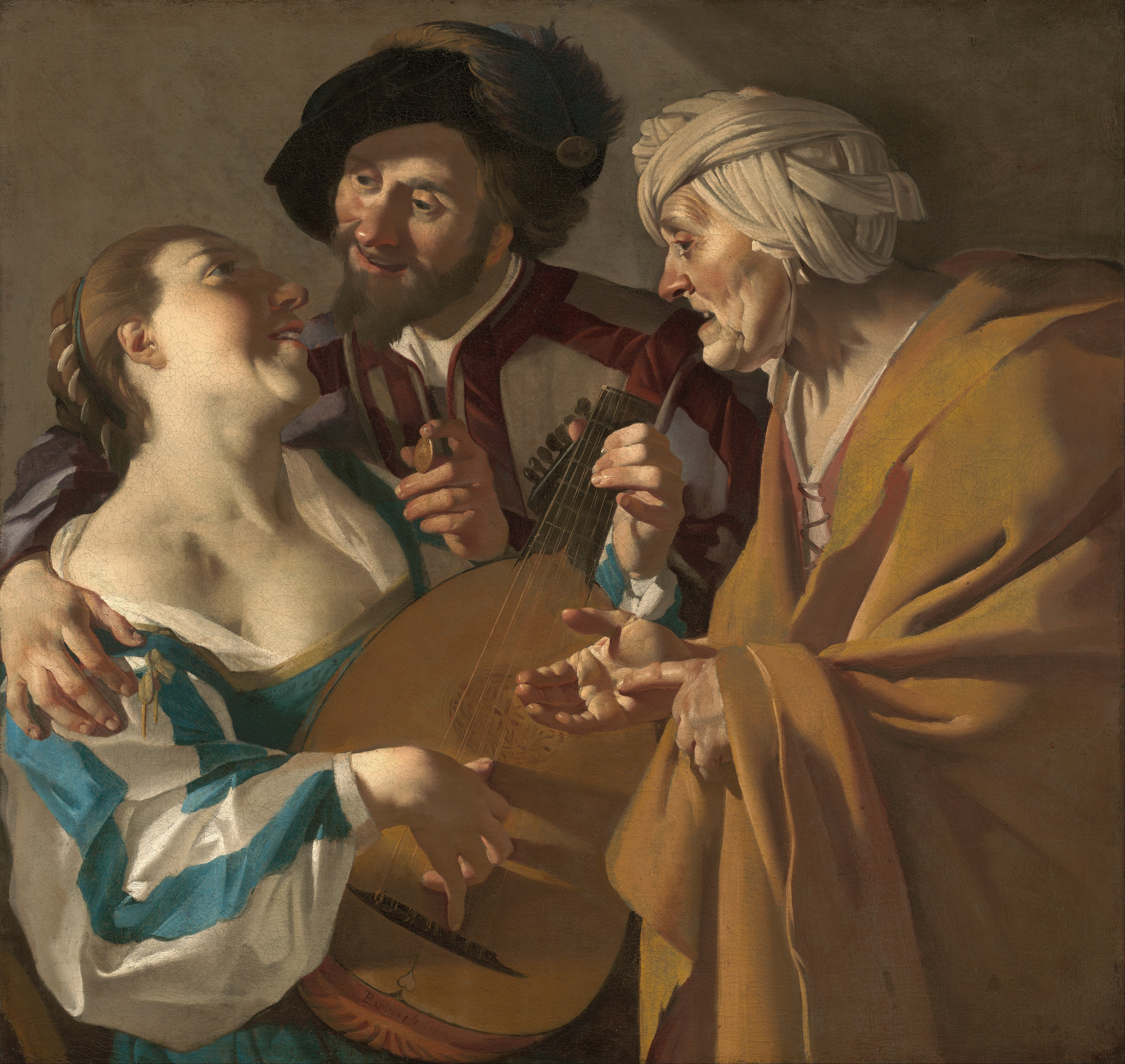
- Artist: Dirck van Baburen
- Year: c. 1622
- Medium: Oil on canvas
- Dimensions: 101.6 cm × 107.6 cm (40.0 in × 42.4 in)
- Location: Museum of Fine Arts, Boston; Boston

The Procuress is the name given to a number of similar paintings by the Dutch Golden Age painter Dirck van Baburen. The painting is in the Caravaggiesque style of the Utrecht school.

== Description ==
The painting shows three figures: a prostitute on the left, the client in the middle and the procuress on the right pointing to her palm to indicate that she is expecting payment. The client is holding a coin between his fingers as he puts his arm around the prostitute, who is playing a lute. The painting is an example of the popular genre known as Bordeeltjes, or brothel scenes (see also the overlapping genre of Merry company scenes). The cropped, close-up figures close to the picture plane against a flat blank background are typical of Utrecht Caravaggism.

There are at least three versions of the painting. The versions in the Rijksmuseum in Amsterdam and the Museum of Fine Arts, Boston are attributed to Dirck van Baburen or his studio. One copy of the painting was owned by Maria Thins, mother-in-law of Johannes Vermeer, who reproduced it in the background of two of his own paintings. A copy owned by the Courtauld Institute in London has been identified as the work of the forger Han van Meegeren. This was featured in the third episode of the BBC TV series, Fake or Fortune?.

== Vermeer ==
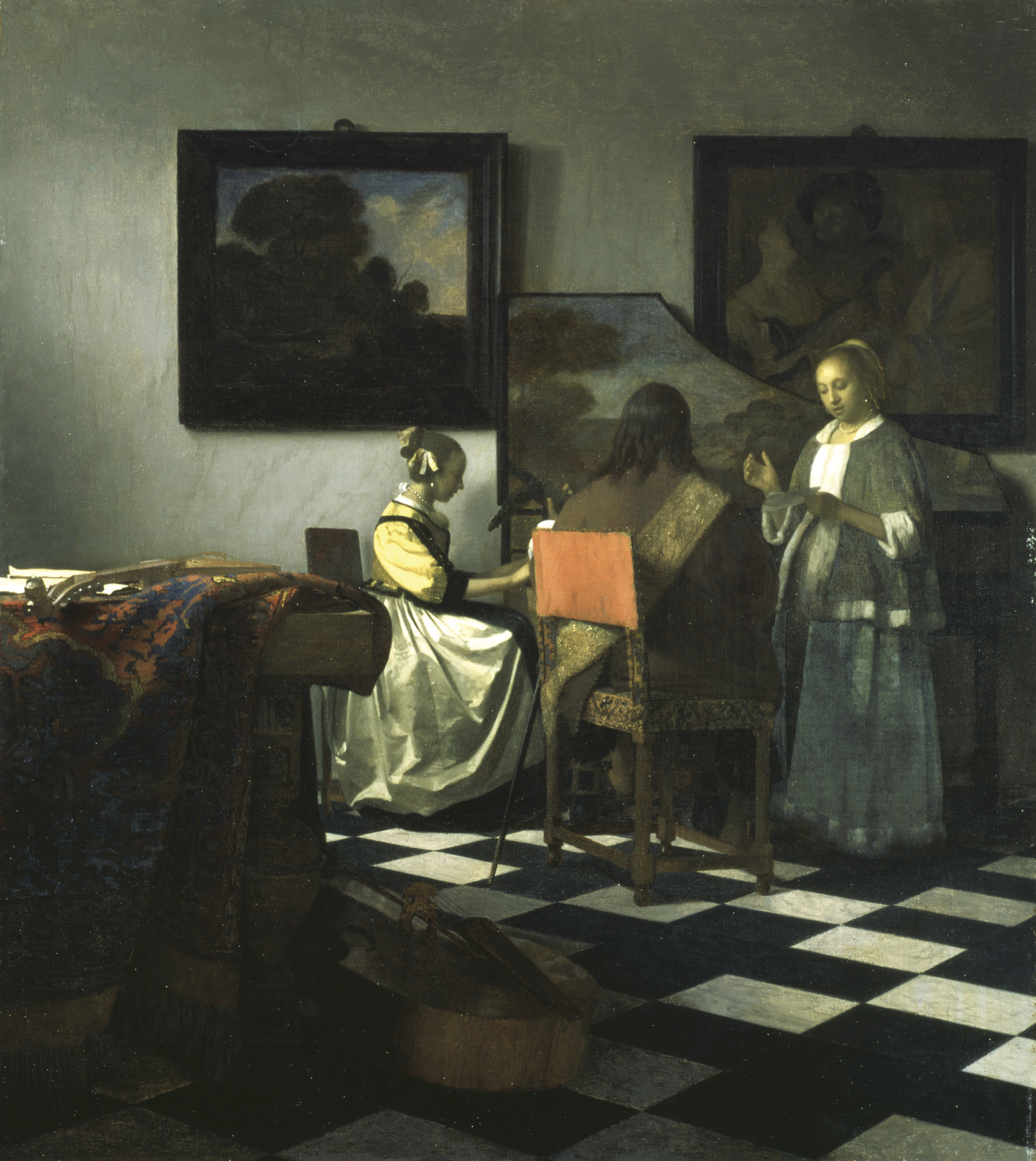
Vermeer's The Concert in which The Procuress hangs on the wall at the upper right

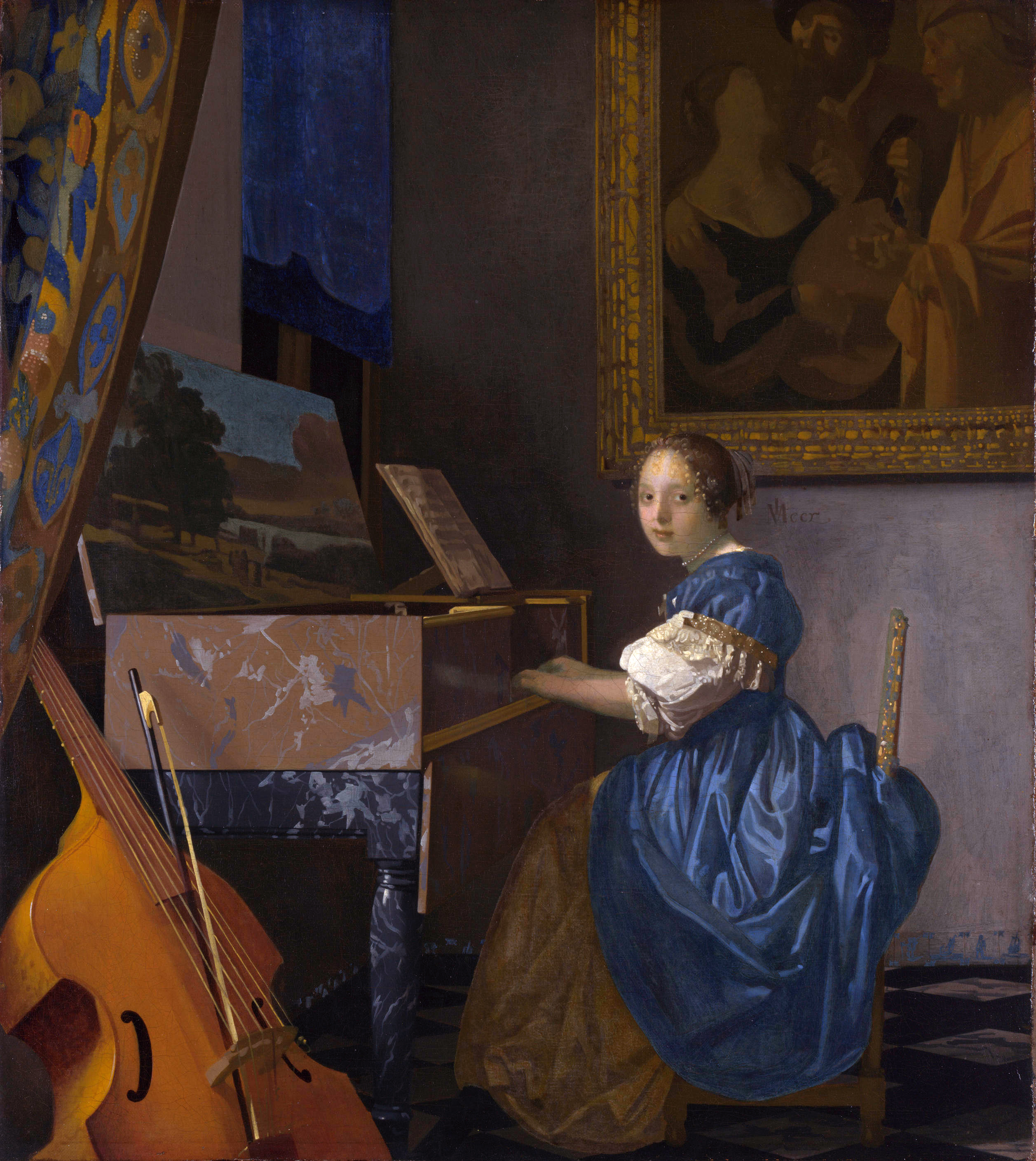
Vermeer's Lady Seated at a Virginal, in which The Procuress hangs on the wall behind the figure

One of these paintings was owned by Vermeer's mother-in-law, and it may have been an influence on one of his own early paintings on a similar subject, also known as The Procuress (1656). It also appears in the background of two of Vermeer's later paintings, The Concert (c.1664) and Lady Seated at a Virginal (c.1670). In both of these later paintings the blatant lust depicted by Baburen is contrasted with the genteel, but erotically charged, middle-class world occupied by Vermeer's women. The contrast between the images may also imply "a more general association between music and love". Vermeer sets up a series of contrasts between his own delicate, restrained style and Baburen's vulgar realism. According to Michael Wayne Cole and Mary Pardo this represents Vermeer's own move away from such low-life subjects. The older, cruder style of Baburen is relegated to the background, "eclipsing it with the more modern kind of genteel subject that Vermeer would soon paint exclusively".

== The Courtauld Institute version ==
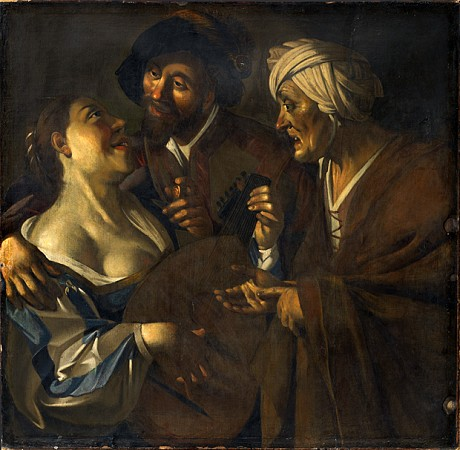
The Courtauld Institute copy, believed to be a van Meegeren forgery

In 1960, Geoffrey Webb presented a version of the painting to the Courtauld Institute. At the end of the Second World War, he had been an allied officer in Europe investigating art works looted by the Nazis. He believed it was a fake painted by Han van Meegeren, and he presented it to the Courtauld as such. In his own defense, van Meegeren claimed that the painting had been bought in an antique shop by his wife. Although the painting was initially believed to be a fake, its authenticity remained controversial, and in 2009 a scientific study indicated that the painting was likely to be genuine, as no modern pigments were found. A spokesperson for the gallery stated that they were "surprised" by the results, but that the evidence indicated that it was "likely to be a 17th-century painting".

Following this, the BBC TV programme Fake or Fortune? conducted a further investigation. The resulting film was first shown July 2011. Philip Mould and Fiona Bruce traveled to Amsterdam where they obtained samples of the paints used by van Meegeren. These included an artificial resin which turned out to be Bakelite. The use of Bakelite had the effect of hardening the paint and thus making it difficult to detect that it was new. Chemical analysis showed Bakelite in the Courtauld painting, thus confirming that it was a modern forgery. Van Meegeren is the only forger known to have used this technique, so the painting was attributed to him. It was probably intended to be used as a prop in Vermeer forgeries. Ironically, it is now more valuable as a van Meegeren forgery than as a 17th-century studio copy.

== See also ==
- Aviva Burnstock
- The Proposition (painting)
