= David de Haen =

Dutch Caravaggesque painter and draughtsman

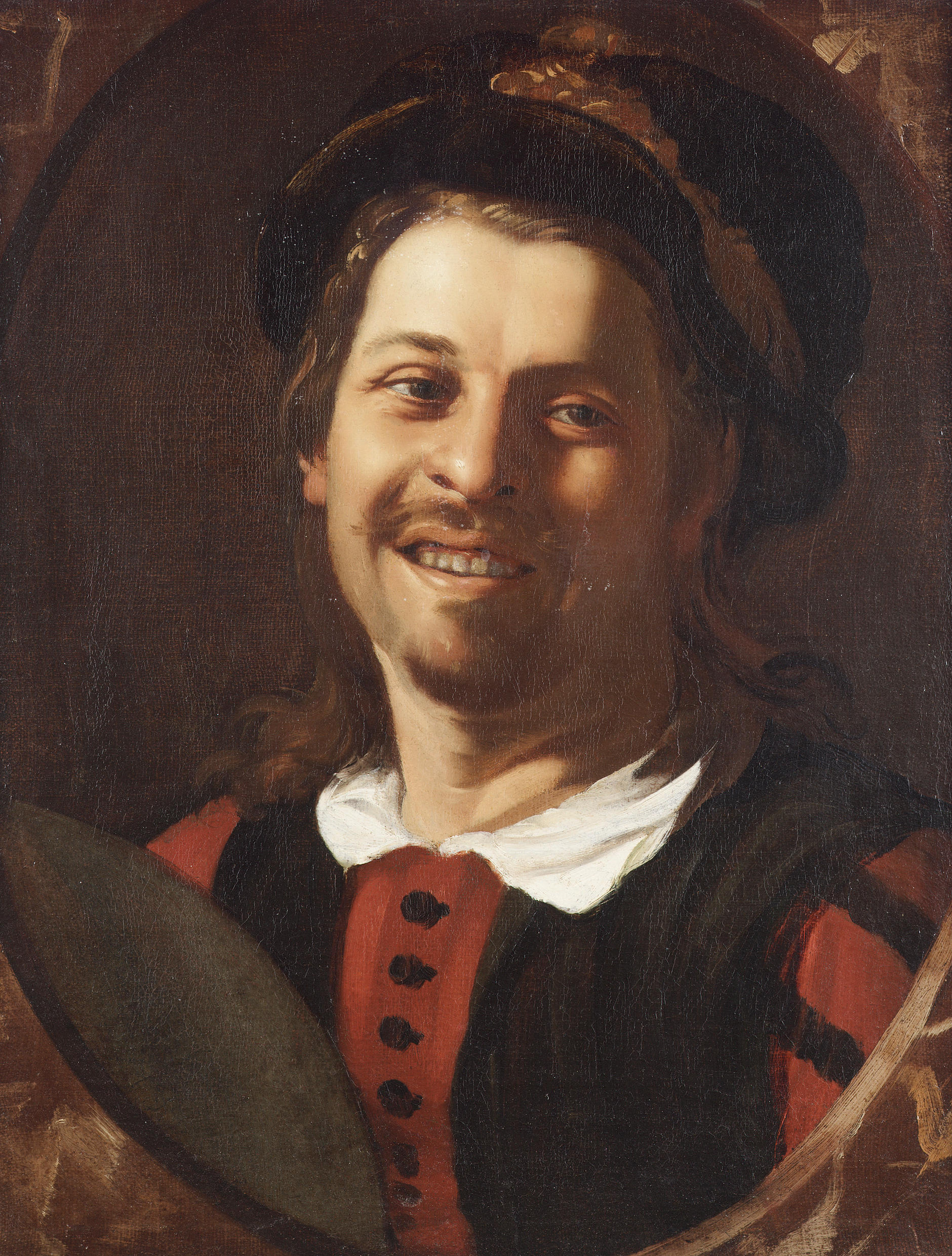
- Self portrait (1617-1619), oil on canvas, 65.8 x 51 cm, private collection
- Born: 1585; Amsterdam, Holland
- Died: 8 August 1622 (aged 36–37); Palazzo Giustiniani; Rome
- Known for: painting
- Movement: Caravaggisti
- Patrons: Pietro Cussida; Vincenzo Giustiniani

David de Haen (1585 – 8 August 1622) was a Dutch Caravaggesque painter and drawing artist, active in Rome between 1615 and 1622.

== Biography ==
David was born in Amsterdam and moved to Rome at a young age where he would remain the rest of his life. He worked with Dirk van Baburen in Rome on the decoration of the chapel of the Pietà in the church of San Pietro in Montorio (1617–20). In 1619 and the spring of 1620 de Haen and van Baburen were living in the same house in the Roman parish of Sant'Andrea delle Fratte. He was a follower of Caravaggio and painted religious and historical paintings
