= Tenebrism =

Style of painting that uses strong contrasts of light and dark for dramatic effect

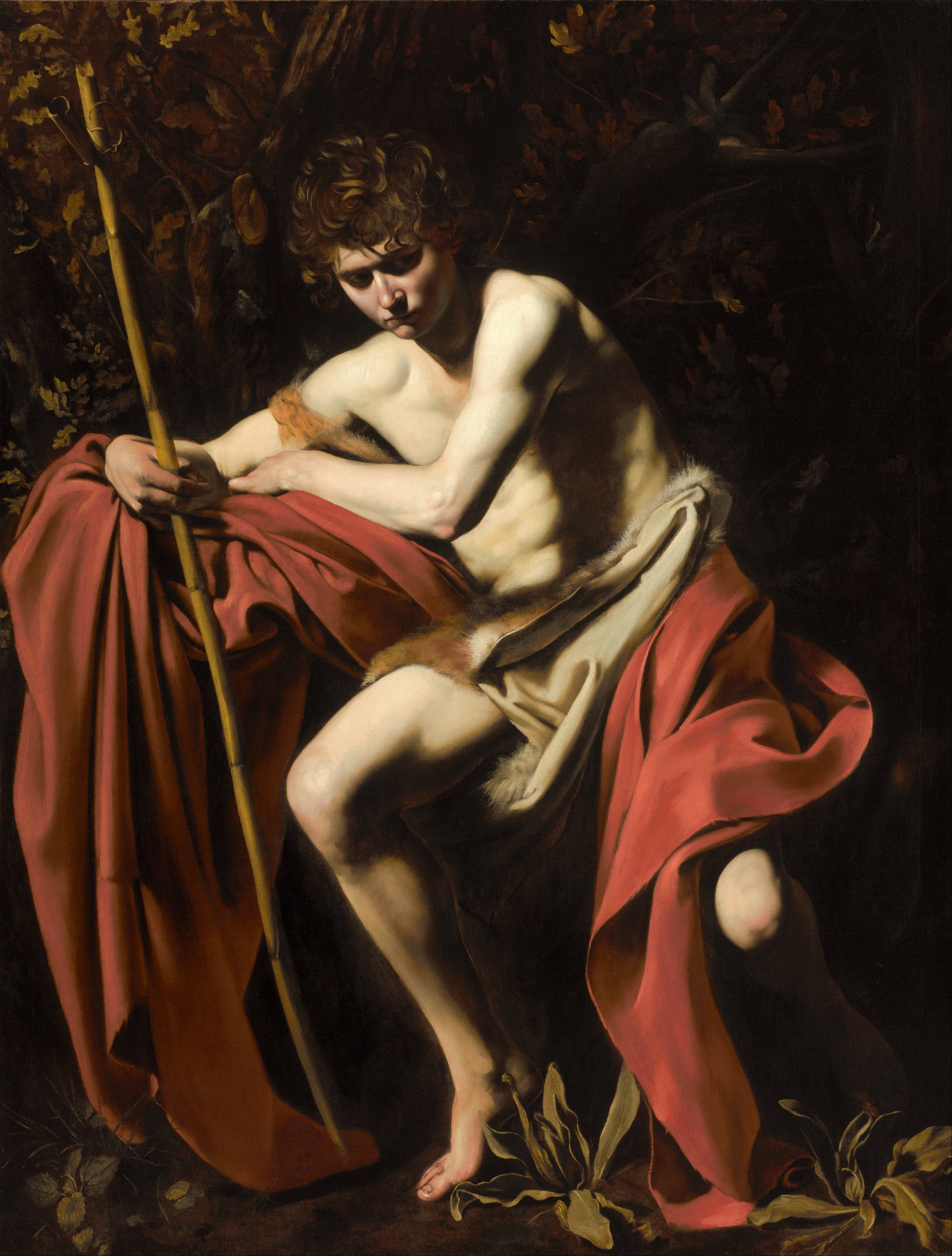
John the Baptist (John in the Wilderness), by Caravaggio, 1604, in the Nelson-Atkins Museum of Art, Kansas City

Tenebrism, from Italian tenebroso ('dark, gloomy, mysterious'), also occasionally called dramatic illumination, is a style of painting using especially pronounced chiaroscuro, where there are violent contrasts of light and dark, and where darkness becomes a dominating feature of the image. The technique was developed to add drama to an image through a spotlight effect, and is common in Baroque paintings. Tenebrism is used only to obtain a dramatic impact while chiaroscuro is a broader term, also covering the use of less extreme contrasts of light to enhance the illusion of three-dimensionality.

== Artists ==
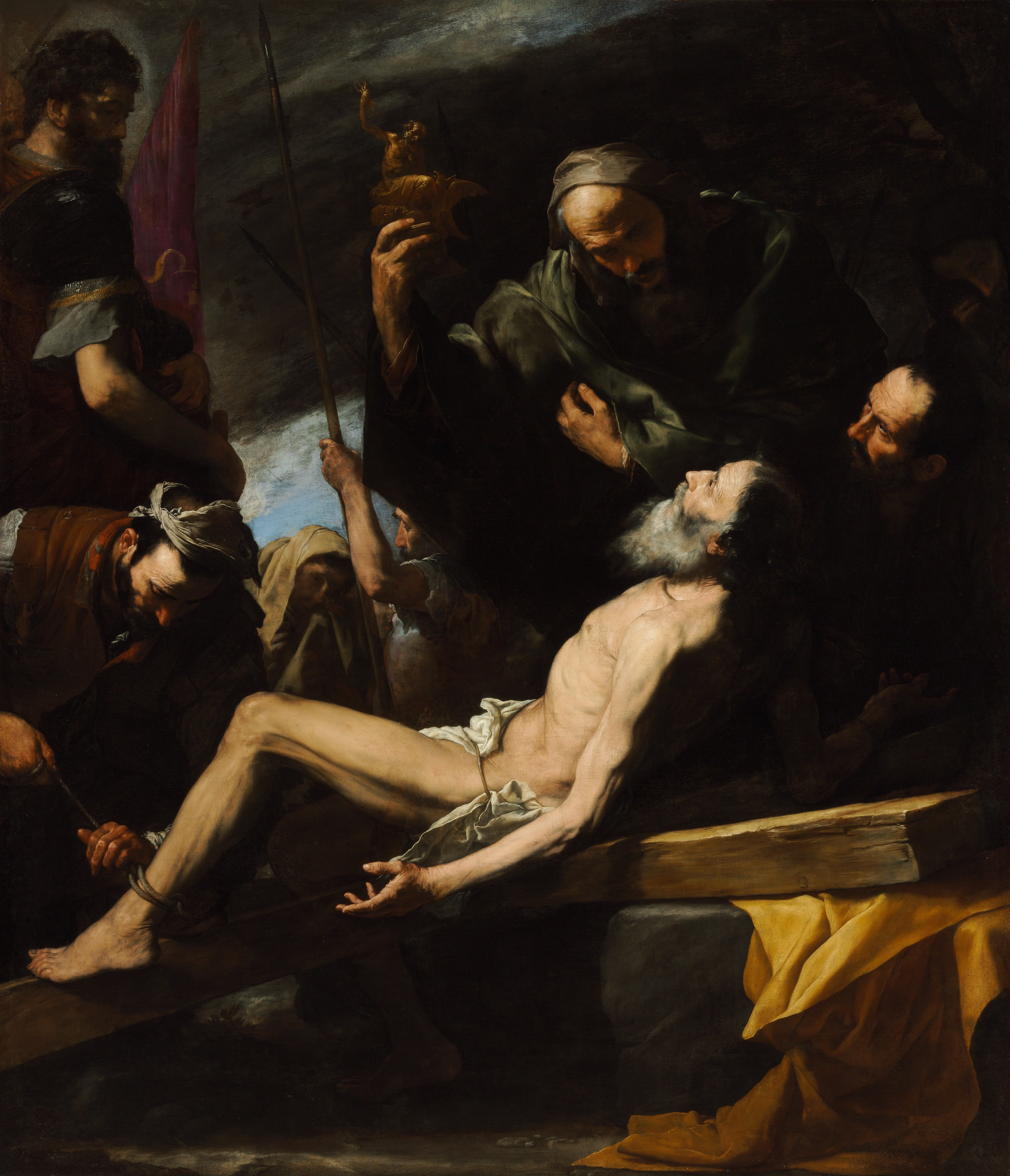
Martyrdom of St Andrew by Jusepe de Ribera, 1628 (Museum of Fine Arts (Budapest))

The artist Caravaggio is generally credited with the invention of the style, although this technique was also used by earlier artists such as Albrecht Dürer in his several self portraits; by Tintoretto in his dramatic religious paintings, such as The Miracle of St Mark; by El Greco, who painted three versions of a composition with a boy, a man, and a monkey grouped in darkness around a single flame; and lesser known painters such as Adam Elsheimer, who painted night-scenes with a restricted lighted areas. The term is usually applied to artists from the 17th century onward.

Among the best known tenebrist artists are Italian, Dutch and Spanish followers of Caravaggio. These include the Italian Baroque follower of Caravaggio, Artemisia Gentileschi, who was an outstanding exponent of tenebrism. Other exponents include the Dutch painters of the Utrecht School and the Spanish painters Francisco Ribalta, Jusepe de Ribera, and their followers, with the term most often being applied to these painters.

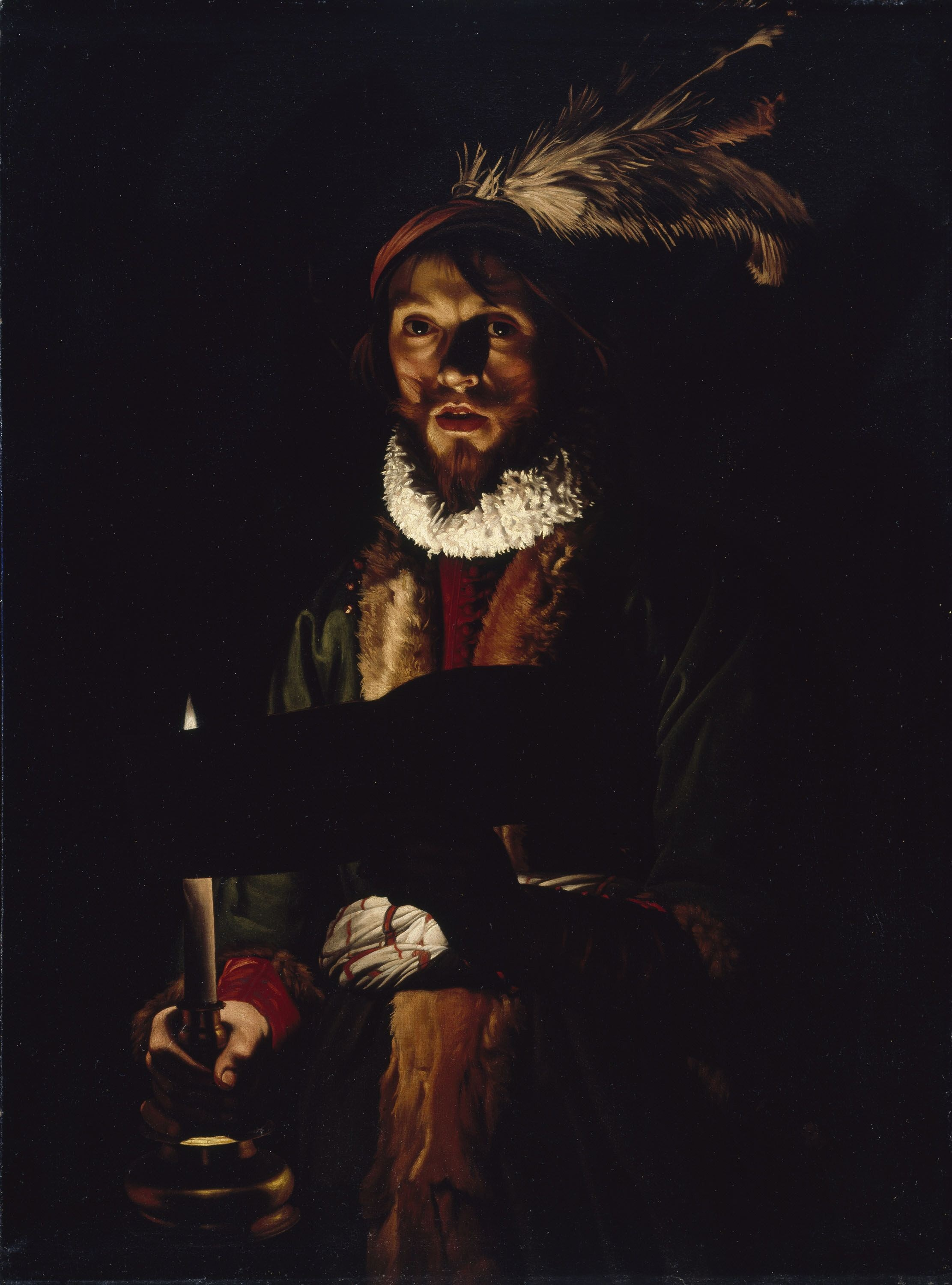
A Man Singing by Candlelight, by Adam de Coster, 1625–1635

Tenebrism is sometimes applied to other 17th-century painters in what has been called the "candlelight tradition". These include Georges de La Tour, who painted many works illuminated with a single candle, Trophime Bigot, Gerrit van Honthorst, and Rembrandt. In Flanders Adam de Coster was recognized as a leading tenebrist who excelled in scenes in which a single candle has its light blocked by an object. The Dutch artist Godfried Schalcken painted many candle-lit scenes. The northern painters (but not always Rembrandt) often achieved a mood of stillness and tranquility through their extreme lighting, rather the reverse of the impression that Spanish painters intended. They are typically as interested in the very dimly-lit areas of the painting as the spot-lit ones, and their light diffuses gently across much of the picture area.

== Later development ==
Later, similar compositions were painted by Joseph Wright of Derby and other artists of the Romantic Movement, but the term is rarely used to characterize their work in general.

== See also ==
- Effets de soir
- Low key
