= The Procuress (Cranach) =

Painting by Lucas Cranach the Elder

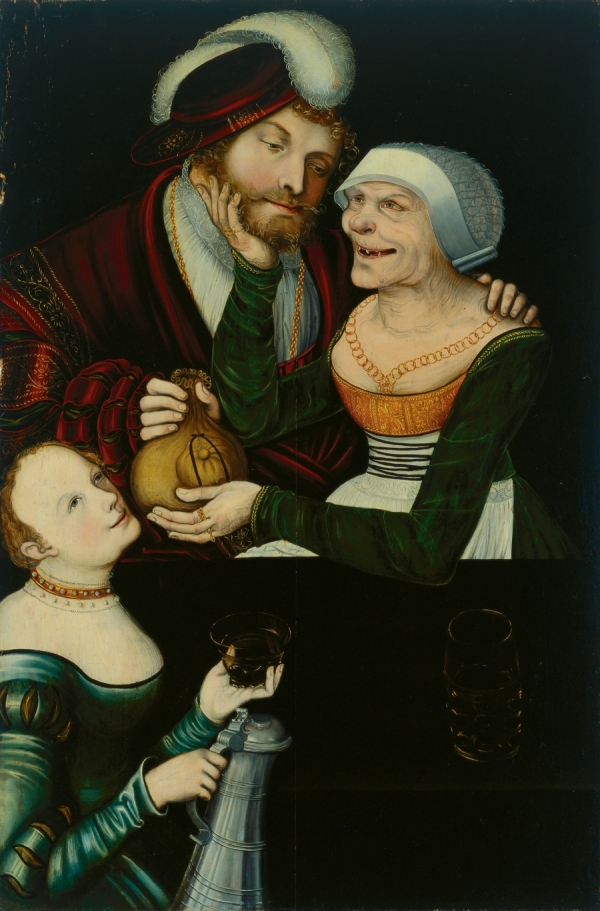
The Procuress, Lucas Cranach the Elder. Oil on panel, 1472–1548, Georgian National Museum, Tbilisi, Georgia, 85 cm x 57 cm, 5cm.

The Procuress is an oil-on-panel painting by the German Renaissance painter Lucas Cranach the Elder, created in 1548. The style of the painting is the Northern Renaissance. There are three characters depicted in the painting: the young man, who gives a bag of money to the procuress – the protagonist of the composition, and a young woman who will marry the man. The wicked appearance of the procuress creates a deleterious and ensnaring aura that captures attention immediately. The painting is now housed in Georgian National Museum, in Tbilisi, Georgia. However, it had an exceptionally long and dangerous journey before getting back to the museum. The estimated value of The Procuress is more than $40 million.

== History ==
The first known owner of the painting was the Grand Duke George Alexandrovich of Russia, who brought The Procuress to Georgia in the 19th century. However, the next proprietor became the private collector Alexandre Korganoff at the beginning of the 20th century, who later sold it to the Georgian painter and art collector Dimitri Shevardnadze. Later, Shevardnadze housed the painting in the Art Gallery in Tbilisi. In March 1921, Georgian public benefactor, historian, and archeologist Ekvtime Takaishvili left for Paris, France with the Georgian Republic government-in-exile members after The Bolshevik Russia's Red Army annexed and terminated Georgia's independence. Takaishvili gathered some of the precious pieces from the Georgian treasury and took them with him to France, to safeguard national invaluable objects from the flames of warfare. The painting was protected in Paris not only from the Soviets but also from the Nazis. Adolf Hitler considered Lucas Cranach the Elder to be the painter with the most German panache. He chased after Cranach's paintings and owned multiple of his works. In 1946, The Procuress was safely returned to Georgia, together with other treasures. From 1969 it spent a decade in Moscow for restoration and finally returned to Georgia only to mysteriously vanish for the next decade.

=== Return ===
In July 1994, five armed people broke in to the Museum of Arts in the middle of the night to seize The Procuress and a few other renowned paintings. Blackouts were routine in 90s Georgia and the alarm system was out on the night of theft too. This eased the job for the robbers, who tied up and locked guards one by one, consequently leaving the museum without making much noise. The overall chaos in the city helped the criminals to vanish together with The Procuress. On May 10 of 2004, Georgian prosecutor Valeri Grigalashvili, was requested to the Chapidze Clinic by one of the most authoritative “thieves in law” – Gogi Chikovani. After clarifying that he would not be charged, Chikovani offered a trade to the prosecutor. That same year, armed and masked special force police surrounded his house in Tbilisi and broke in. They forced the family members to sign falsified documents and stole everything they could. The items that special police mugged included Chikovani's family ring and crucifix, which were priceless for him. He promised to return The Procuress in exchange to these items. As promised, Georgian state police found The Procuress near the Matrimonial palace on the left embankment of the river Mtkvari. Exactly a decade after its disappearance, The Procuress was returned to the government and again placed in the Georgian National Museum.
