= Maria Thins =

Mother-in-law of painter Johannes Vermeer, c. 1593-1680

- Born: c. 1593; Gouda, Netherlands
- Died: 27 December 1680; Delft, Netherlands
- Known for: Providing for her daughter, her son-in-law Johannes Vermeer, and their family
- Spouse(s): Reynier Bolnes, until legal separation
- Children: Willem, Cornelia, and Catharina

Maria Thins (c. 1593 – 27 December 1680) was the mother-in-law of Johannes Vermeer and a member of the Gouda Thins family. She was raised in a devout Dutch Catholic family with two sisters and a brother. Outliving her parents and siblings, she received inheritances over the years, making her a wealthy woman. She married a prosperous brickmaker, Reynier Bolnes, in 1622. They had three children together, Catharina, Willem, and Cornelia. By 1635, Bolnes verbally and physically abused his wife and daughters. Thins moved to Delft with her daughters. Her son Willem stayed with his father. Thins was a wealthy woman due to the separation settlement of her husband in 1649 and the estates she inherited from her family.

Her daughter Catharina married Johannes Vermeer, an artist, art dealer, and operator of the family's inn in Delft. Vermeer and Catharina lived at Thins house by 1660. The couple had fifteen children, four of whom died in infancy. Raising nearly a dozen children strained Vermeer financially. He relied on the support from his mother-in-law. During the Franco-Dutch War (1672–1674), Vermeer became impoverished. Thins reduced the money she provided to Catharina and her husband due to the loss of income during that period. Vermeer died in 1675, and Thins died five years later. Catharina was the only one of Thins' children to survive her. Thins drew up her will to maximize what she could provide for her grandchildren and their education, while limiting how much might be taken by Catharina's creditors. Catharina died in 1687.

== Early life ==
Maria was born c. 1593 in Gouda to a prominent Dutch Catholic family, Catharina van Hensbeeck (d. 1633) and William Thin (d. 1601). They lived in the house named De Trapjes (The Little Steps) in Gouda. Maria had three siblings, none of whom were married. Her sister Elisabeth became a nun. She also had a sister Cornelia and a brother Jan. Since none of her siblings married, Thins ultimately inherited a large estate. The family conducted mass in their home, while at the time it was illegal for a group of Roman Catholics to assemble in Gouda. The local sheriffs broke up a religious meeting at their house in 1619.

Garrit Camerling (d. 1627) of Delft became her stepfather in 1605 when he married Catharina van Hensbeeck. She was related to Abraham Bloemaert (1566–1651) through her cousin Jan Geensz Thins. Before her marriage, Thins lived in Delft with a prosperous young woman who was her friend.

== Marriage and children ==
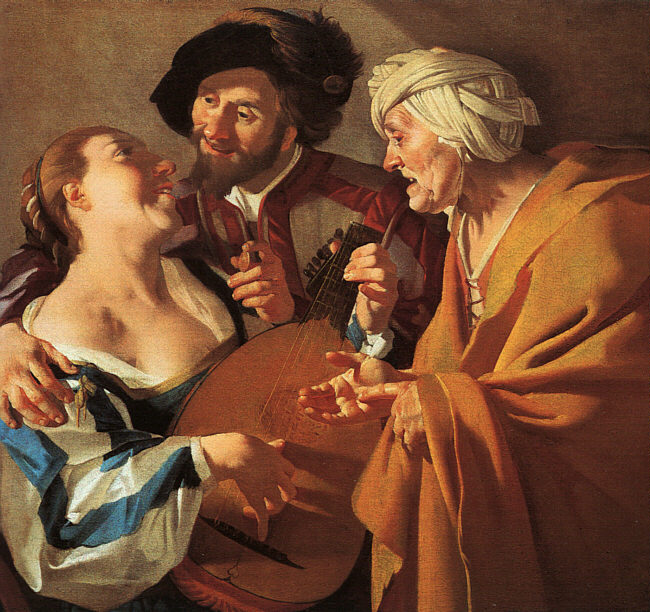
Dirck van Baburen, The Procuress, 1622, oil on canvas, Museum of Fine Arts, Boston. The painting was owned by Maria Thins, mother-in-law of Johannes Vermeer, who reproduced it within two of his own paintings.

In 1622, Maria Thins married Reynier Bolnes (ca. 1593–1676), a prominent and prosperous brickmaker. Thins was an heiress when she married, and she collected art, including several in the style of Utrecht Caravaggists.

=== Children ===
Thins had three children, the youngest of whom was Catharina Bolnes (c. 1631–1688), nicknamed Trijntge. She also had a son Willem, and a daughter Cornelia. Around 1635, Reynier became verbally and physically abusive with her and her children. At the age of nine, Catharina ran to neighbors because she thought that Reynier's abuse of Cornelia could kill her. Reynier confessed that he physically abused Cornelia and would do it again if Thins beat their son Willem. Reynier and Willem began eating separately from the female members of the family, and the father encouraged his son to be abusive and noncompliant with Thins.

=== Divided family ===
Thins moved to Delft in 1642 to get away from her abusive husband. Jan Geensz Thins, who was her guardian and cousin, purchased a home for her there the prior year. Jan became Thin's guardian following the early death of her father. Thins attained custody of her daughters in 1641 and moved with them to Delft. William stayed with his father, whose business began to fail. Thins lived on Oude Langendijk next to the Jesuit Catholic Church in the Catholic section of Delft called paepenhoek (the Papists' Corner).

Thins received half of her husband's assets, a substantial amount, in 1649. By 1653, Reynier Bolnes was bankrupt. Thins derived income from annuities, interest income, and property rentals, including farmland. She also lived off of the capital of her investments. Thins and her sister Cornelia Thins (d. 1661) received a sizeable inheritance from their brother Jan Willemsz Thins following his death in 1651. Thins attained a comfortable standard of living of 15,000 or more guilders a year in the 1660s.

Cornelia died in 1649. In 1664, Thin's son Willem, a jobless bachelor, was locked up in an institution after an argument with his mother, and for attacking Catharina, his pregnant sister, with a stick. In 1665, Maria Thins was entrusted with her son's property. She wrote a will, which limited Willem's share to the legal minimum of one sixth of her estate. She mentioned that he had been calling her names since his youth. Willem died in 1676.

=== The Vermeers ===
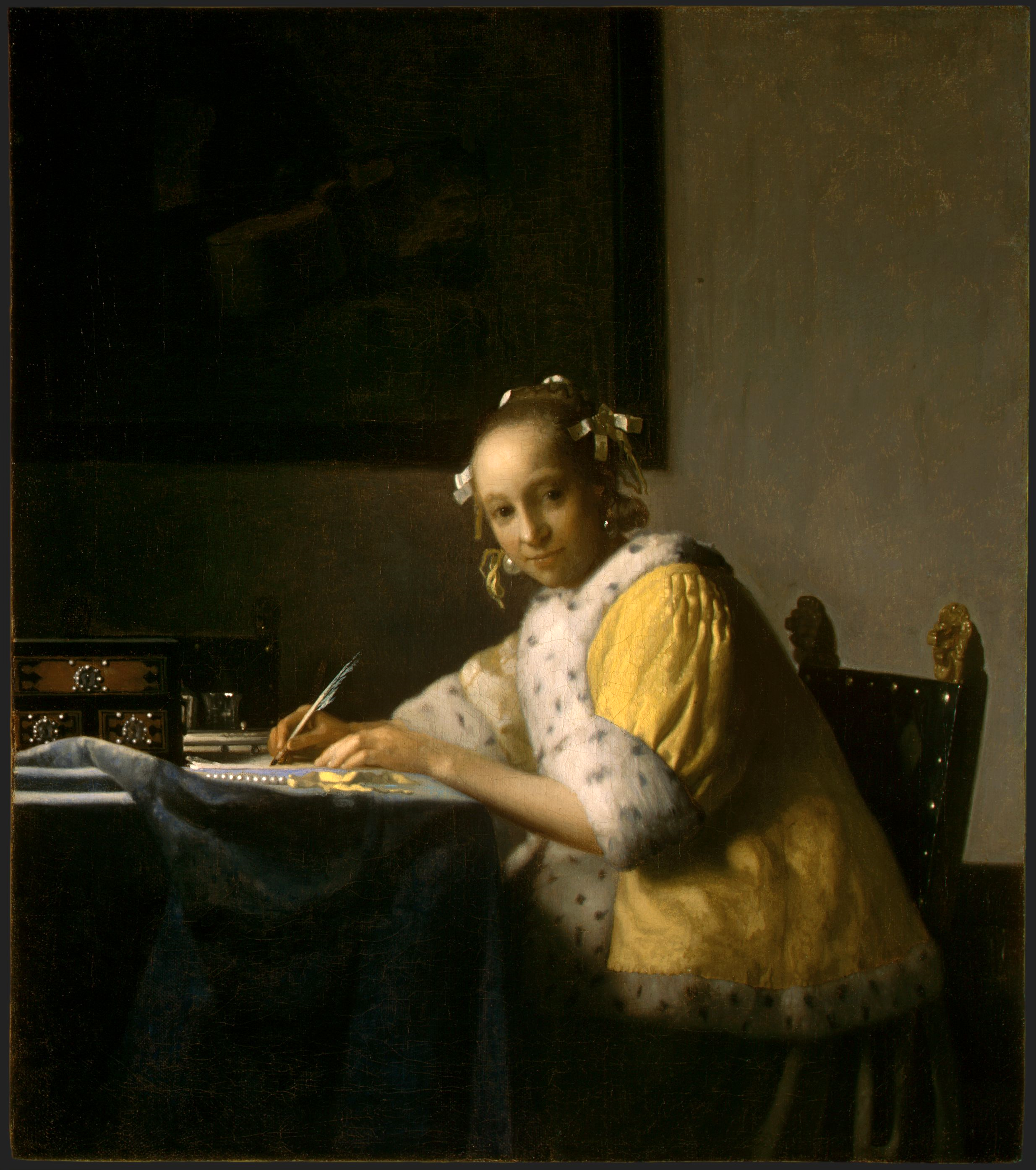
Johannes Vermeer, A Lady Writing a Letter, c. 1665, oil on canvas, National Gallery of Art, Washington, D.C.

Thin's daughter, Catharina, came to know Johannes Vermeer and wished to marry him. Her mother disapproved of the marriage because he was not Catholic, and also likely because he was of a lower artisan class. By 1652, Vermeer helped his mother run the family's inn and was an art dealer, taking over his deceased father's business. Before they married, Thins stated that although she did not approve, she would not prevent Catharina and Vermeer from marrying. Vermeer likely converted from Reformed Protestant to Catholicism by the time of their union. Catharina and Vermeer married in Schipluy (present-day Schipluiden) on 20 April 1653. By December 1660, the Vermeers lived in the large house of his wealthy mother-in-law Maria Thins, described as a "strong-willed" woman. It was unusual at the time for married men and women to settle into the houses of their parents. Vermeer relied on Thin's residence and financial support to take care of his family.

Vermeer painted in the artist's studio and sold art from the house. His works portray subjects with clothing and furnishings more luxurious than his own. Biographer Anthony Bailey claims that since Vermeer used models from his household, it is likely that he made a painting of his wife. He asserts that Catharina is depicted in A Lady Writing a Letter due to her "fond expression" and "concentrated gaze of the unseen painter."

Thins played an essential role in their life. She was a devotee of the Jesuit order in the nearby Catholic Church, and this seems to have influenced Johannes and Catharina.

They had eleven children at the time of Vermeer's death, four of their children died young between 1660 and 1673. Most of their children were born at Thin's house. Their third son was called Ignatius, after the founder of the Jesuit Order. Catharina inherited the Ben Repas estate following her Aunt Cornelia's death in February 1661.

Thins hired Vermeer to manage financial issues for her in 1667 and 1675. He collected monies owed her, and he handled her investments. The Rampjaar (disaster year) following the outbreak of the Franco-Dutch War (1672–1674) was particularly hard on Vermeer's ability to make money as an artist and an art dealer. He had to take a loss on sales of works of art and was unable to sell his own works. His mother-in-law was financially strained during this period due to the loss of rental income from farmland due to the war. In one instance, she rented out land near Schoonhoven that was then flooded to prevent the French army from crossing the Dutch Water Line. The farmland was not arable for a time. Thins reduced the money that she spent to support the Vermeers. In 1675, Vermeer went on several business trips for his mother-in-law, first to Gouda, when her husband had died, and then to Amsterdam. There Vermeer borrowed money by fraudulently using her name.

Vermeer died and was buried on 15 December 1675. Unable to pay their debts, Catharina blamed the financial fallout of the war for their losses and petitioned for bankruptcy in April 1676. Ten of their eleven children were still underage when Vermeer died. Catharina continued to live at her mother's house with their children. After Vermeer's death, Maria Thins received The Art of Painting for her financial support of Catharina's family. Catharina paid off other debts with paintings or used them as surety until she paid off debts.

== Later years and death ==
Thins died and was buried on 27 December 1680. The burial record states that she was the widow of Reijnier Bolnes. Thins crafted her will to maximize her grandchildren's support and education, preventing her estate from going to Catharina's creditors. The grandchildren were assigned a guardian, Hendrick van Eem, to look out for their interests. Catharina, considered responsible, was encouraged by her mother to ensure that her children were educated so that they could support themselves. Her daughter Catharina moved to Breda. Catharina Bolnes received "Holy Oil" on 23 December 1687, before being buried on 2 January 1688.

== See also ==
- Writing to Vermeer an opera depicting Maria Thins and Catharina Bolnes

== Bibliography ==
- Bailey, Anthony (2002). Vermeer: A View of Delft. Macmillan. ISBN 978-0-8050-6930-3.
- Blankert, Albert (2007). Vermeer. New York : Overlook Press. ISBN 978-1-58567-979-9.
- Franits, Wayne E., ed. (2001). The Cambridge companion to Vermeer. Cambridge; New York : Cambridge University Press. ISBN 978-0-521-65330-5.
- Liedtke, Walter A. (2001). Vermeer and the Delft School. New York: The Metropolitan Museum of Art.
- Montias, John Michael (1989). Vermeer and His Milieu: A Web of Social History. Princeton University Press. doi:10.2307/j.ctv301fz1. JSTOR j.ctv301fz1. S2CID 242041929.
