= Dirck van Baburen =

Dutch painter (c. 1595–1624)

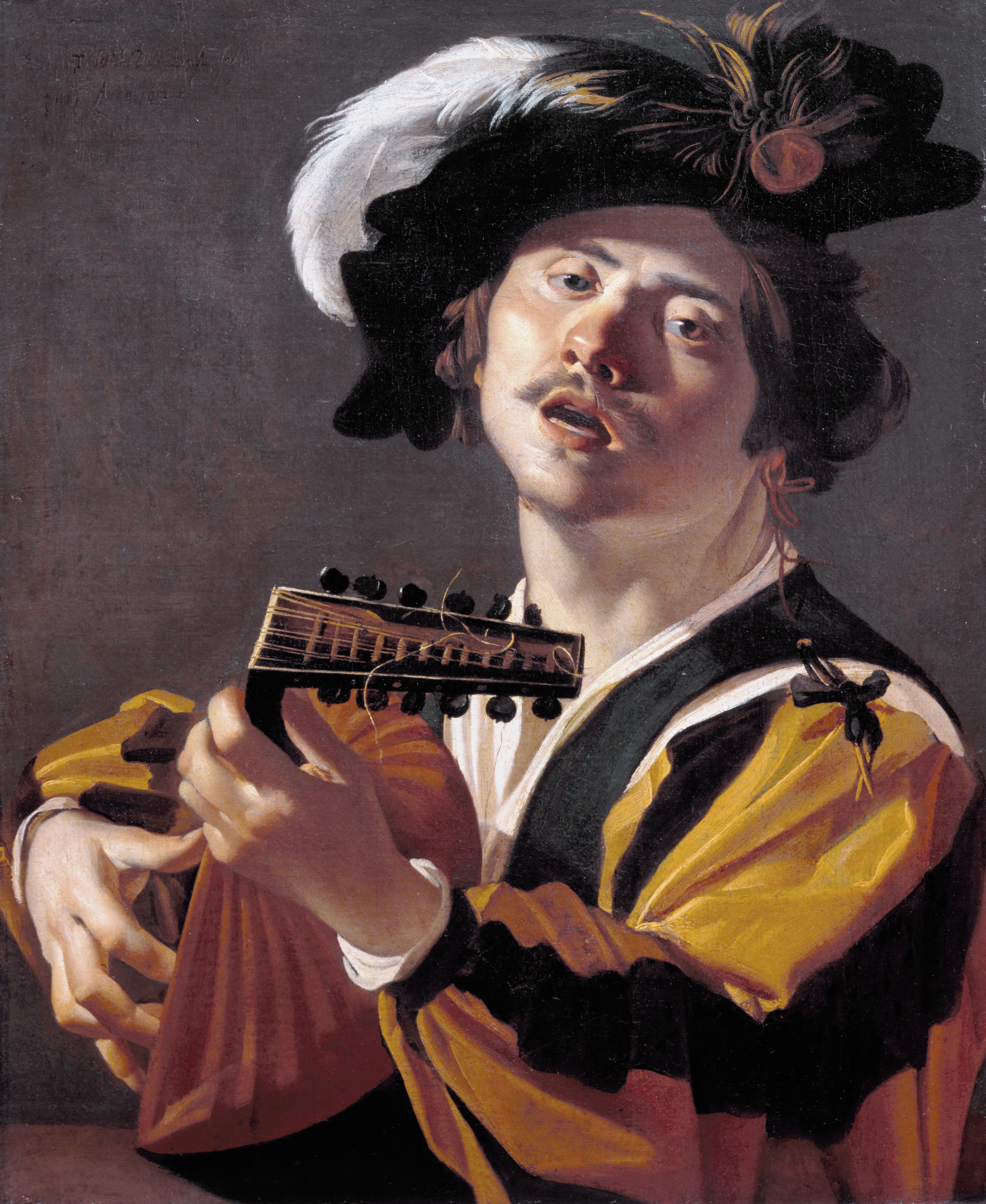
The Lute Player, 1622.

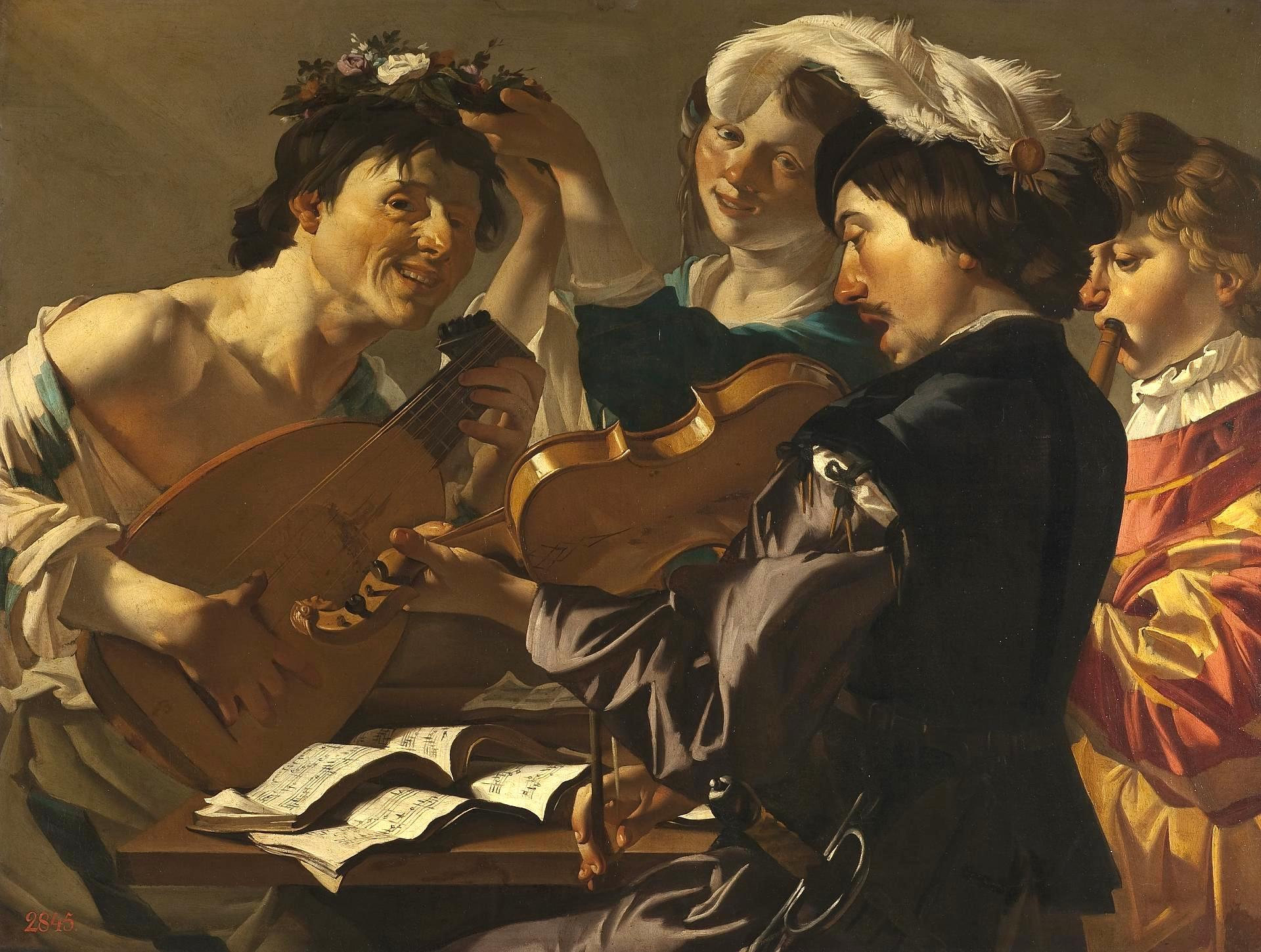
Dirck van Baburen, Concert, 1623, oil on canvas, Hermitage Museum at Saint Petersburg.

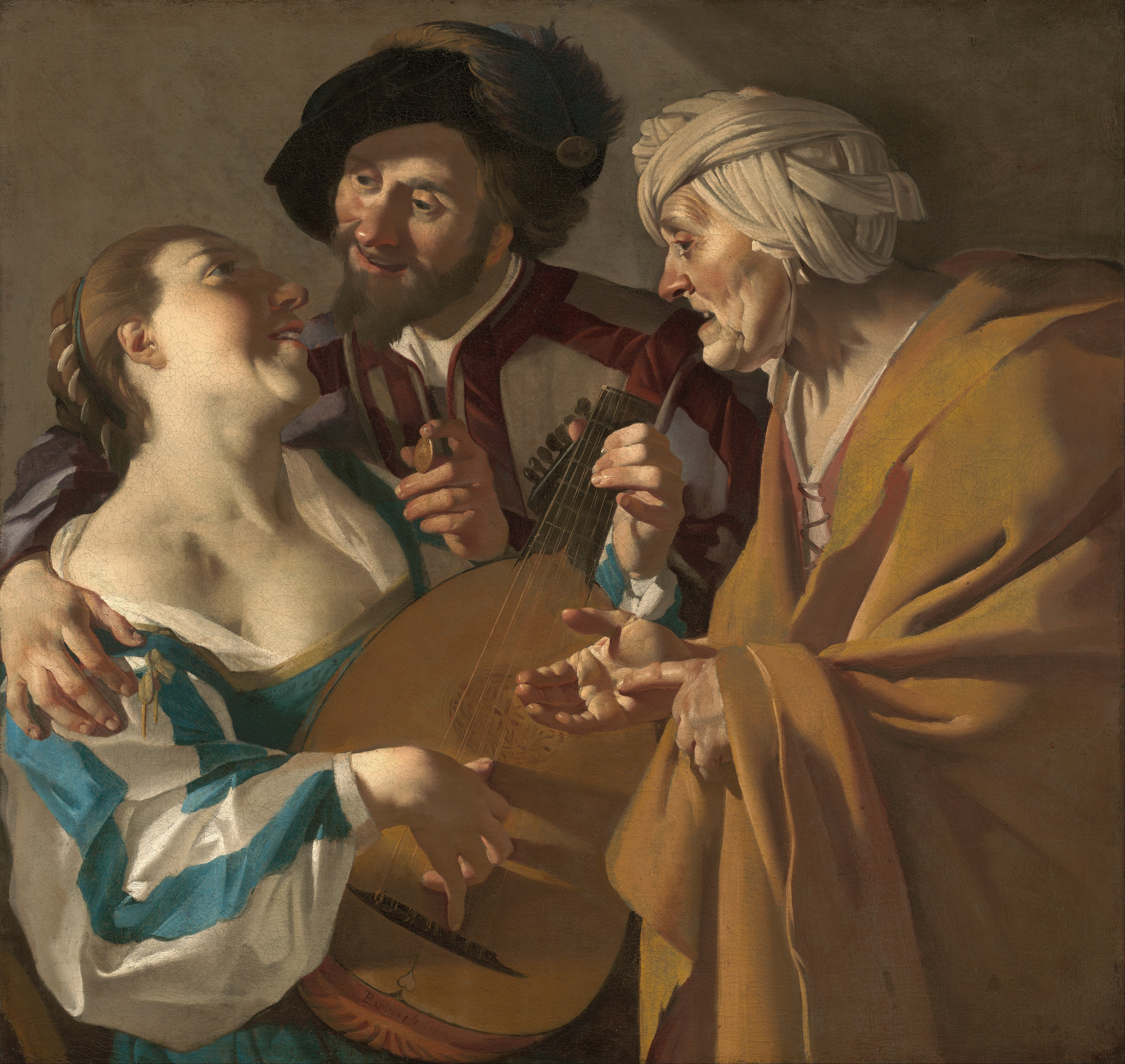
Dirck van Baburen, The Procuress, 1622, oil on canvas, Museum of Fine Arts, Boston. The painting was owned by Maria Thins, mother-in-law of Johannes Vermeer, who reproduced it within two of his own paintings.

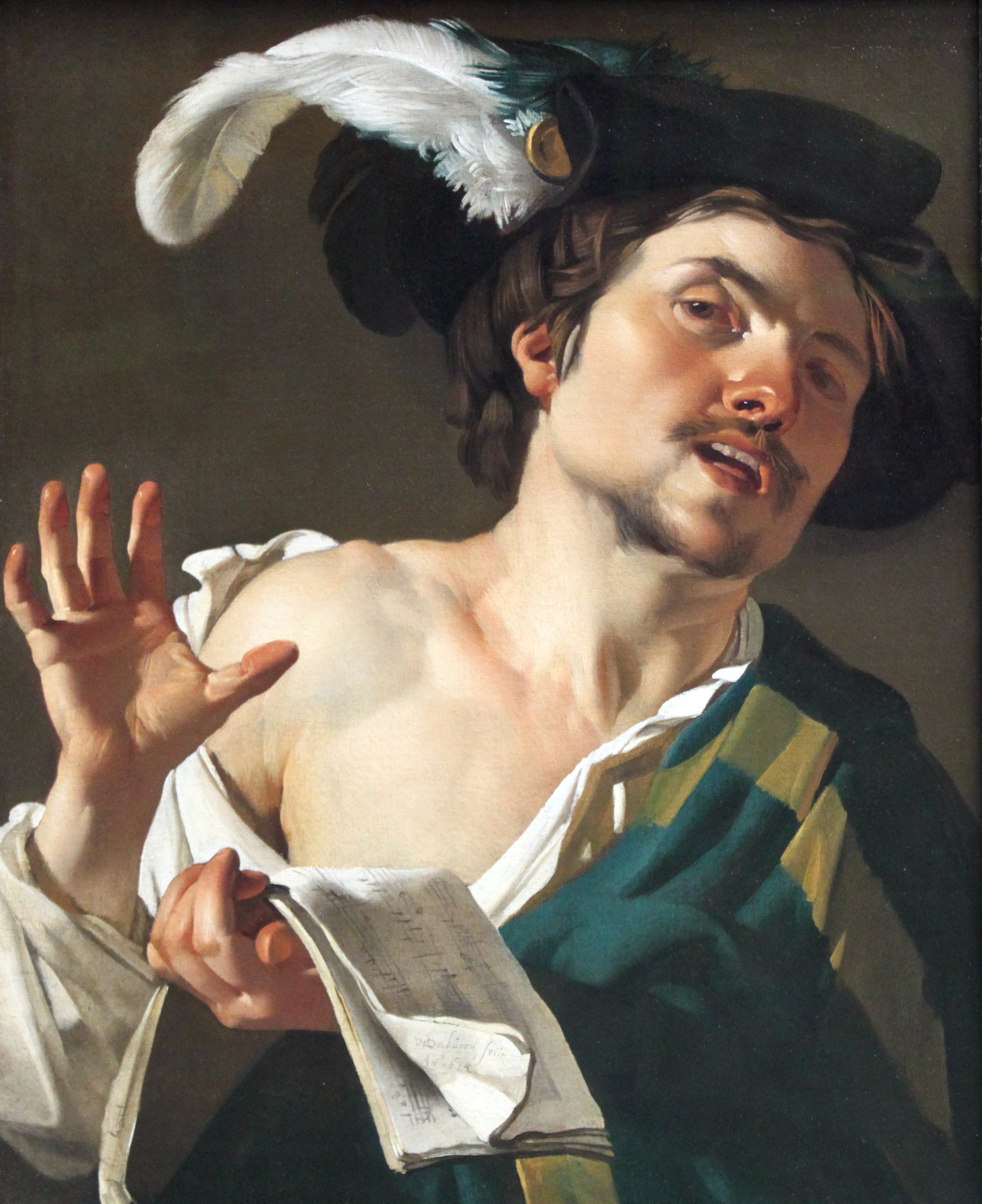
Young man singing, 1622, Städelsches Kunstinstitut

Dirck Jaspersz. van Baburen (c. 1595 – 21 February 1624) was a Dutch painter and one of the Utrecht Caravaggisti.

== Biography ==
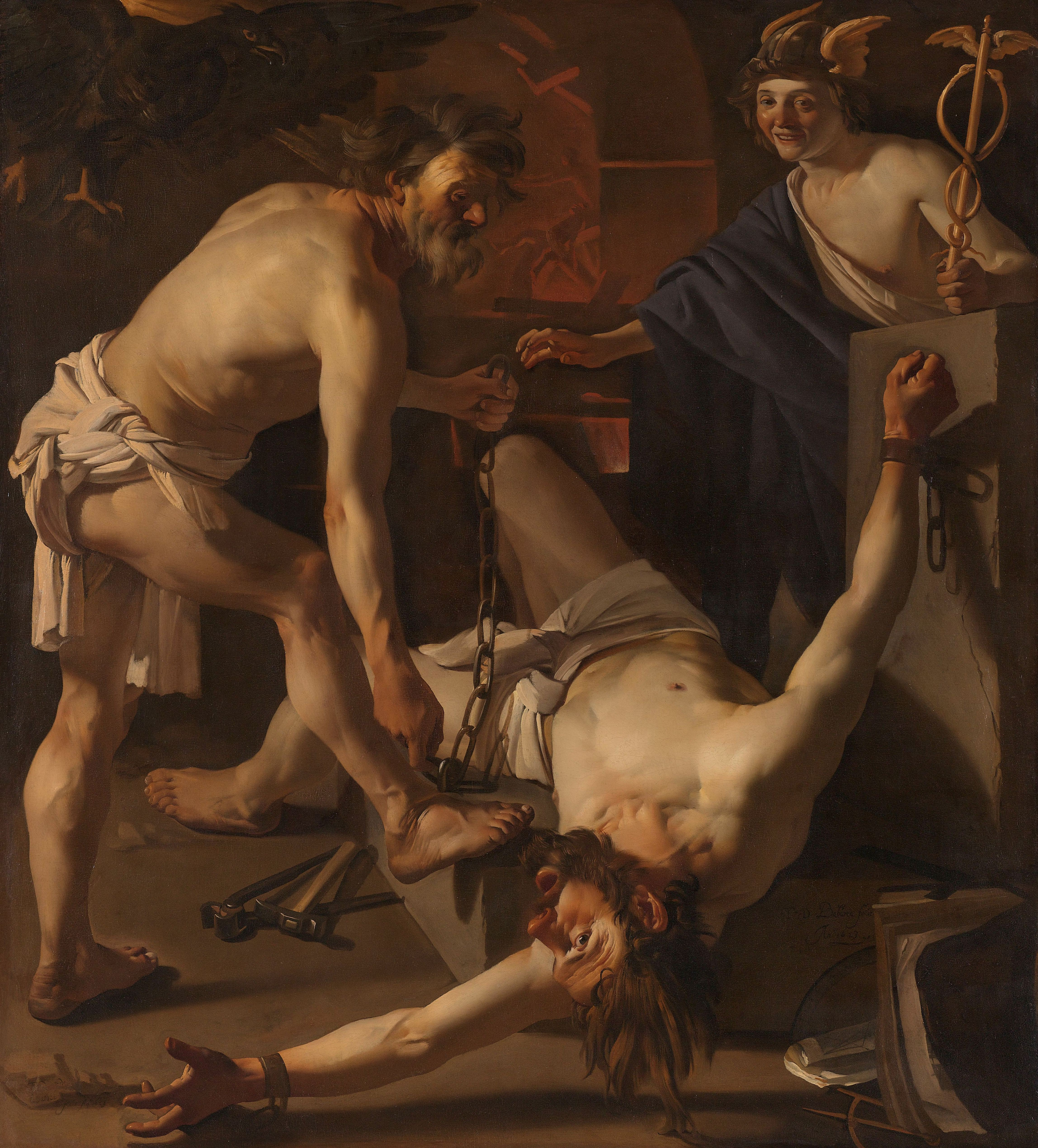
Prometheus Being Chained by Vulcan by Dirck van Baburen (1623) Oil on canvas, 202 x 184 cm. Rijksmuseum, Amsterdam.

Dirck van Baburen was probably born in Wijk bij Duurstede, but his family moved to Utrecht when he was still young. He was also known as Teodoer van Baburen and Theodor Baburen. The earliest reference to the artist is in the 1611 records of the Utrecht Guild of St. Luke as a pupil of Paulus Moreelse. Sometime between 1612 and 1615, he travelled to Rome. There, he collaborated with fellow countryman David de Haen and befriended the close follower of Caravaggio, Bartolomeo Manfredi. Baburen also came to the attention of the art collectors and patrons Vincenzo Giustiniani and cardinal Scipione Borghese, and possibly under their influence he received the commission to paint the altarpiece of the Entombment for the chapel of the Pietà in San Pietro in Montorio around 1617. Baburen was one of the earliest artists to belong to the group of Dutch-speaking artists active in Rome in the seventeenth-century known as the "Bentvueghels" ("Birds of a Feather"); his nickname was "Biervlieg" ("Beer Fly", or one who drinks a lot).

In late 1620, Baburen returned to Utrecht, where he began painting genre scenes. Until his death in 1624 the painter, along with Hendrick ter Brugghen and Gerard van Honthorst, helped establish the stylistic and thematic innovations now known as the Utrecht School of Caravaggisti. He was buried on 28 February 1624 in the Buurkerk, a medieval church which now houses the Museum Speelklok. Around 1629, Constantijn Huygens noted Baburen as one of the important Dutch painters active in the early decades of the seventeenth century.

== Career ==
Dirck van Baburen's career was short, and only a few of his paintings are known today. He mostly painted religious subjects in Rome, including the San Pietro in Montorio Entombment that is indebted to Caravaggio's version of the same subject in the Vatican Museums. Baburen also painted a Capture of Christ (Borghese Gallery) for Scipione Borghese and Christ Washing the Feet of the Apostles (Gemäldegalerie, Berlin) for Vincenzo Giustiniani.

The Utrecht works made between 1621 as 1624, the final years of Baburen's career, merged the visual characteristics learnt from Caravaggio and Manfredi into genre, mythological and history painting. Prometheus Being Chained by Vulcan (Rijksmuseum, Amsterdam), for example, adapts Caravaggio's upside-down figure of St. Paul from the Conversion of St. Paul (Santa Maria del Popolo, Rome) for the position of the fallen Prometheus, who was punished for stealing fire from the gods and giving it to mortals.

He was among the first artists to make use of genre subjects such as musicians and cardplayers. One of his best-known works is The Procuress (Museum of Fine Arts, Boston). It depicts a man offering a coin for the services of a lute-playing prostitute while an old woman, the lady's procuress, inspects his money. This painting (or a copy) was owned by Johannes Vermeer's mother-in-law and appears in two of that artist's works, The Concert (stolen from the Isabella Stewart Gardner Museum, Boston) and Woman Seated at a Virginal (National Gallery, London). Han van Meegeren forged copy of this work which he may have intended to use as a prop in his forgeries of Vermeer.

== Works ==
He painted several musicians, many of which probably contain a self-portrait, as they all seem to feature the same man.

- The Entombment, ca. 1617, (San Pietro in Montorio, Rome)
- Capture of Christ, before 1621 (Borghese Gallery, Rome)
- Christ Washing the Feet of the Apostles, before 1621 (Gemäldegalerie, Berlin)
- Uriah's Death in Battle, before 1621 (private collection)
- Youth Playing a Small Whistle 1621 (Centraal Museum, Utrecht)
- The Procuress, 1622 (Museum of Fine Arts, Boston, 50.2721)
- A Merry Toper, Burton Constable Hall
- Christ among the Doctors, 1622 (National Gallery of Norway, Oslo)
- Backgammon Players, c. 1622 (Historisches Museum, Bamberg)
- The Lute Player, 1622, (Centraal Museum, Utrecht)
- Loose Company, 1623 (Gemäldegalerie, Mainz)
- Prometheus Being Chained by Vulcan, 1623 (see above)
- Crowning with Thorns, 1623 (Museum Catharijneconvent, Utrecht)
- Crowning with Thorns, 1623 (Nelson-Atkins Museum of Art, Kansas City, Missouri)
- Cimon and Pero (Roman Charity), ca. 1623 (York City Art Gallery)
- Saint Sebastian Tended by Irene, ca. 1623 (Kunsthalle Hamburg)
- Eleusinian Mysteries, (Palace of the Dukes of Braganza, Guimarães)

== References and sources ==
=== Sources ===
- Dirck van Baburen in History of Art
- Brigstocke, Hugh, "Baburen, Dirck (Jaspersz.) van," Grove Art Online. Oxford University Press, March 15, 2007.
- Brown, Christopher, "The Utrecht Caravaggisti," in Gods, Saints & Heroes: Dutch Painting in the Age of Rembrandt. National Gallery of Art, Washington D.C., 1980, pp. 101–121. ISBN 0-89468-039-0.
- Franits, Wayne, Dutch Seventeenth-Century Genre Painting (2004). ISBN 0-300-10237-2.
- Levine, David A., "Schildersbent [Bent]," Grove Art Online. Oxford University Press, [March 15, 2007].
- Murray, P. & L., Dictionary of art and artists. Penguin Books (1996). ISBN 0-14-051300-0
- Nicolson, B., Caravaggism in Europe (2nd edn., 1990). ISBN 88-422-0233-9.
- Slatkes, L. J., Dirck van Baburen: A Dutch Painter in Utrecht and Rome (1965).
- Slive, Seymour, Dutch Painting 1600-1800 (1995) ISBN 0-300-06418-7.
