= Utrecht Caravaggism =

Art movement influenced by Caravaggio

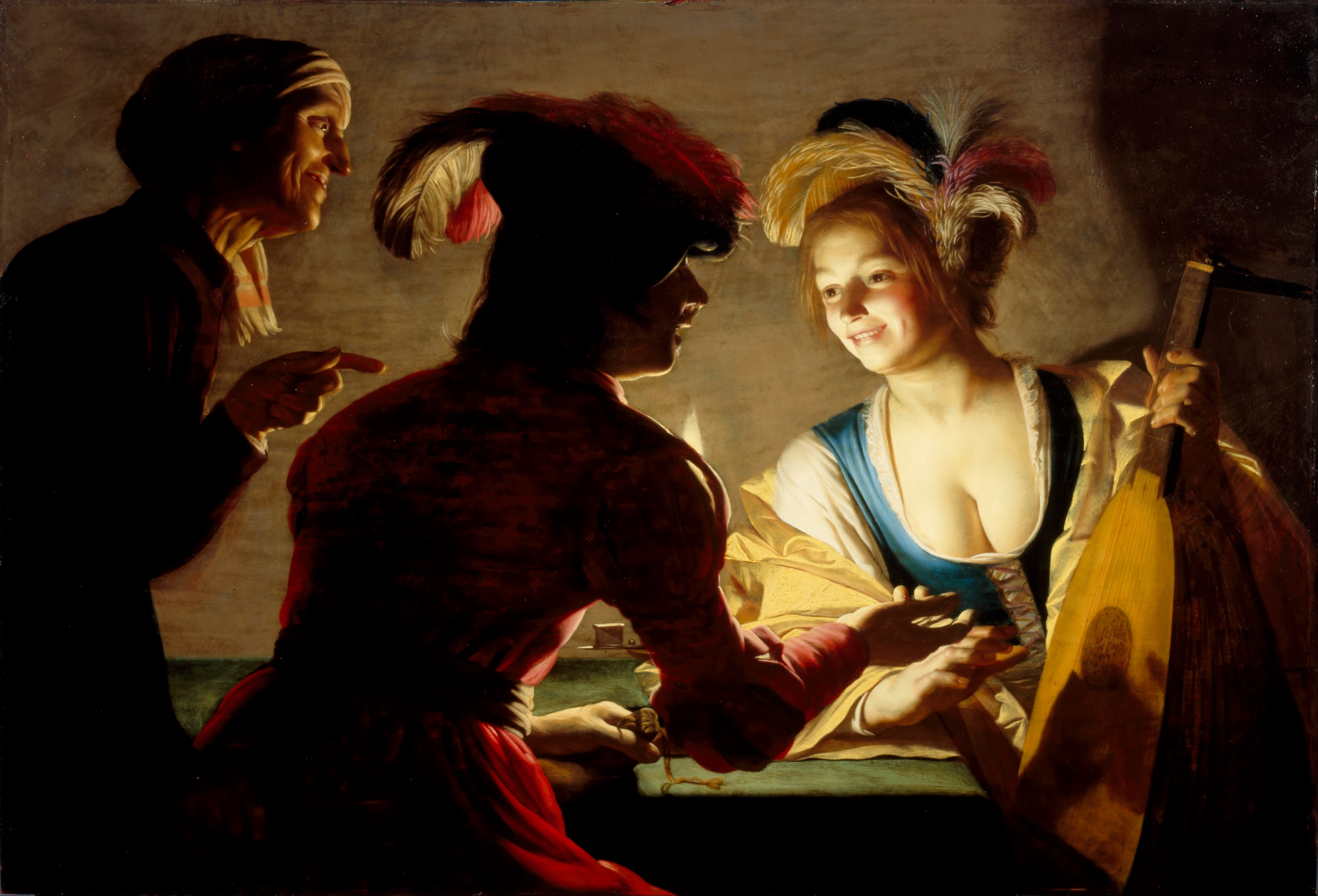
The Procuress by van Honthorst, 1625

Utrecht Caravaggism (Dutch: Utrechtse caravaggisten) refers to the work of a group of artists who were from, or had studied in, the Dutch city of Utrecht, and during their stay in Rome during the early seventeenth century had become distinctly influenced by the art of Caravaggio. Upon their return to the Dutch Republic, they worked in a so-called Caravaggist style, which in turn influenced an earlier generation of local artists as well as artists in Flanders. The key figures in the movement were Hendrick ter Brugghen, Gerrit van Honthorst and Dirck van Baburen, who introduced Caravaggism into Utrecht painting around 1620. After 1630 the artists moved in other directions and the movement petered out. The Utrecht Caravaggisti painted predominantly history scenes and genre scenes executed in a realist style.

== History ==
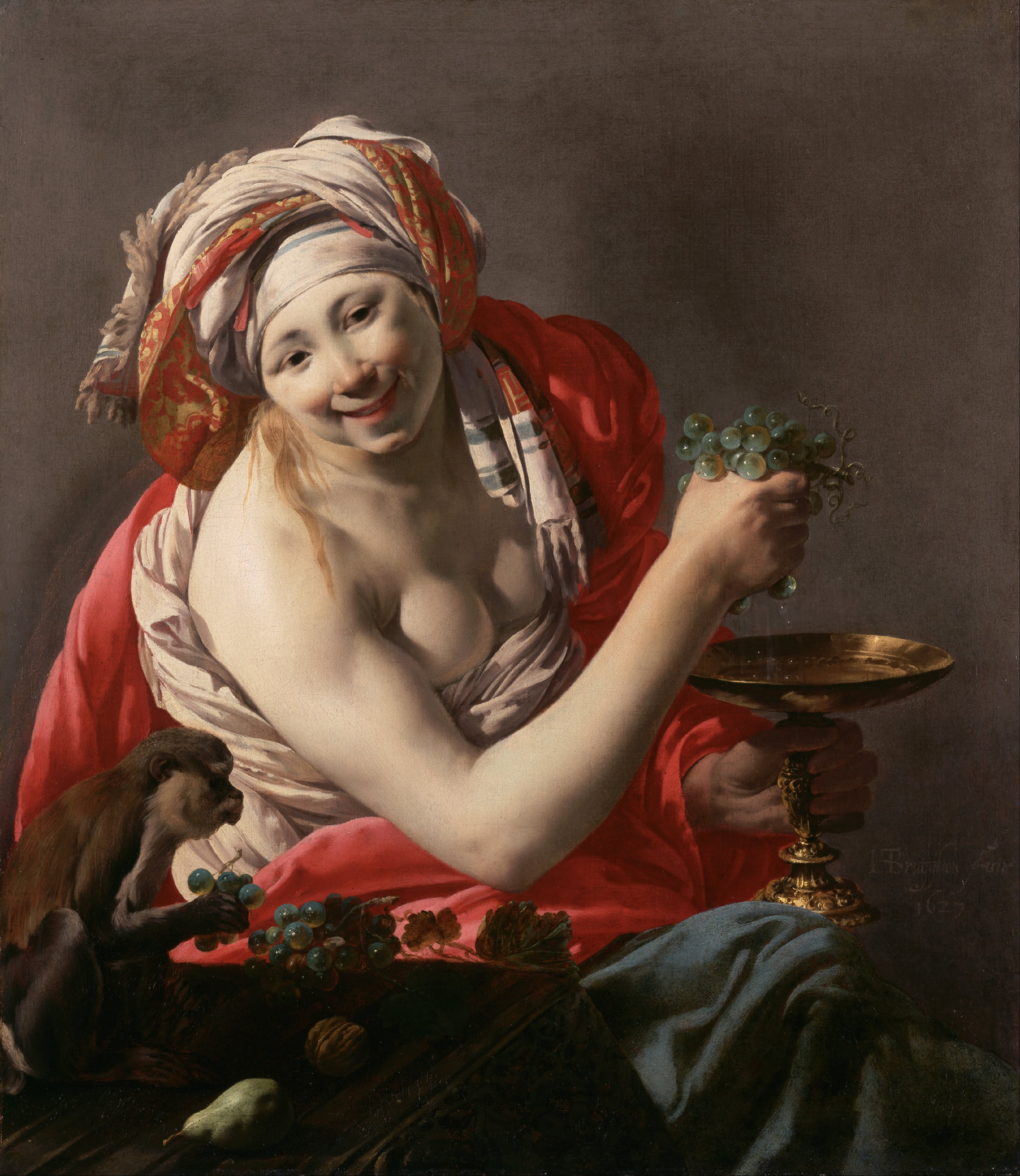
Bacchante with an Ape by ter Brugghen, 1627

Painters such as Dirck van Baburen, Gerrit van Honthorst, Hendrick ter Brugghen and Jan van Bijlert were all in Rome in the 1610s, a time when the tenebroso of Caravaggio's later style was very influential. Adam Elsheimer, also in Rome at the same time, was probably also an influence on them. Back in Utrecht, they painted mythological and religious history subjects and genre scenes, such as the card-players and gypsies that Caravaggio himself had abandoned in his later career.

Utrecht was the most Catholic city in the United Provinces. Its population was about 40% Catholic in the mid-17th century and the rate was even higher among the elite groups, who included many rural nobility and gentry with town houses there. It had previously been the main centre, after Haarlem, of Northern Mannerist painting in the Netherlands. Abraham Bloemaert, who had been a leading figure in this movement, and taught van Honthorst and other artists, was receptive to the influence of his pupils. He changed his style many times before his death in 1651. The painter Matthias Stom is often associated with Utrecht Caravaggism. There is no evidence that he spent time in Utrecht or studied under any of the members of the movement. It is not even clear that he was Dutch rather than Flemish. His style is generally regarded as being close to that of van Honthorst.

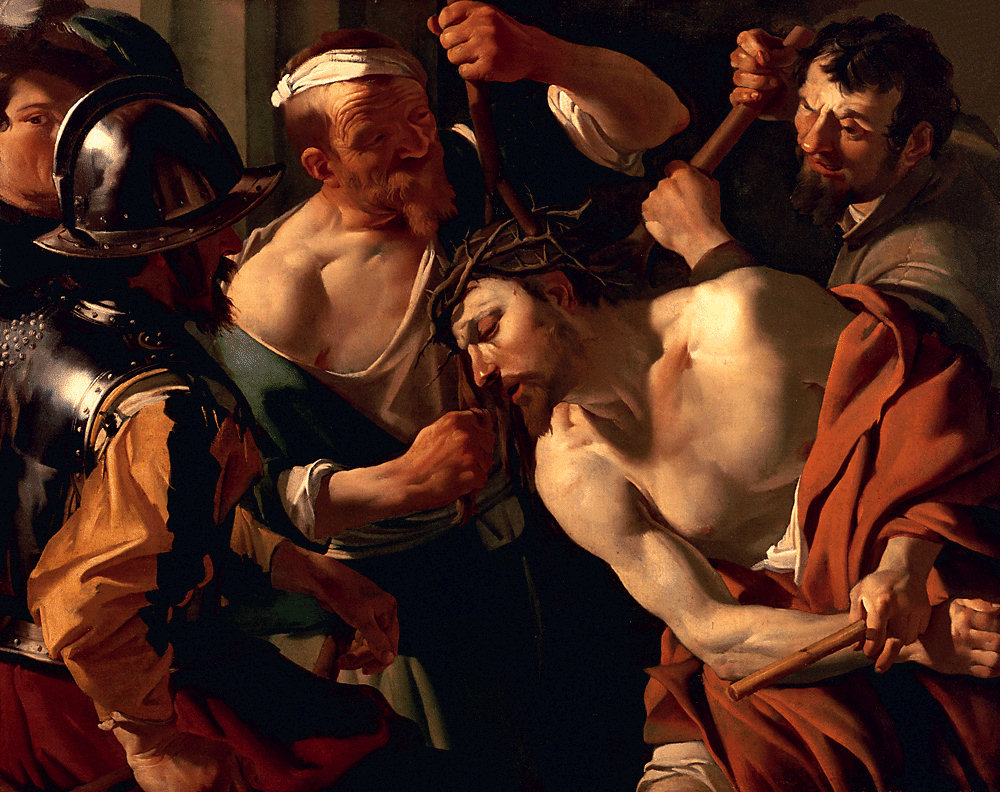
Crowning with Thorns by Dirck van Baburen (1622)

The brief flourishing of Utrecht Caravaggism ended around 1630. At that time, major artists had either died, as in the case of Baburen and ter Brugghen, or had changed style, like Honthorst's shift to portraiture and history scenes informed by the Flemish tendencies associated with Peter Paul Rubens and his followers. They left a legacy through their influence on Rembrandt's use of chiaroscuro and Gerrit Dou's "niche paintings" (a genre developed by Honthorst).

Along with other Caravaggisti active in Italy and Woerden, they set the stage for later artists who worked in a Caravaggio-inspired manner such as Georges de La Tour in Lorraine. They may have also influenced Flemish Caravaggisti such as Theodoor Rombouts, Gerard Seghers, Jan Cossiers, Adam de Coster and Jan Janssens, most of whom had spent time in Italy where they had been influenced first-hand by the same artists who had influenced the Utrecht Caravaggists.

== Work ==
The Utrecht Caravaggisti painted mainly history paintings and genre scenes. They broke with the dominant Northern Mannerism previously in favour in the Dutch Republic, preferring a heightened realism borrowed from Caravaggio. Their works were characterized by a direct and lifelike representation of figures in powerful compositions. They preferred the use of chiaroscuro effects which raised the dramatic impact of their compositions which were filled with a small number of figures which are portrayed in close-up. The saints in their biblical compositions are depicted as ordinary people.
