= Frick Collection =

Art museum in New York City

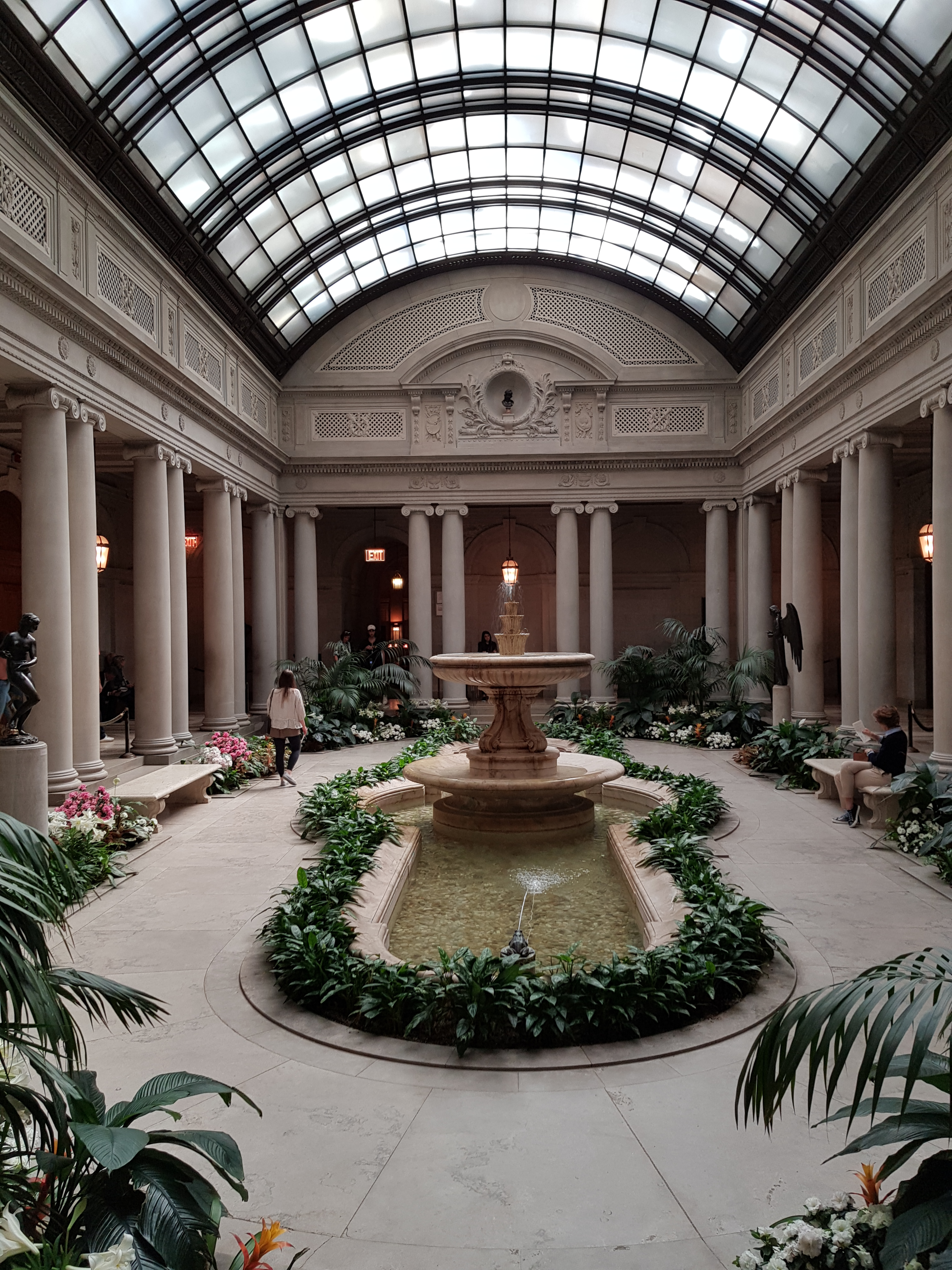
- The museum's courtyard
- Interactive fullscreen map
- Established: December 16, 1935; 90 years ago
- Location: 1 East 70th Street; Manhattan, New York, U.S.
- Coordinates: 40°46′16″N 73°58′02″W
- Type: Art
- Director: Axel Rüger
- Public transit access: Subway: at 68th Street–Hunter College; Bus: M1, M2, M3, M4, M66, M72, M98, M101, M102, M103
- Website: www.frick.org

The Frick Collection (colloquially known as the Frick) is an art museum on the Upper East Side of Manhattan in New York City. It was established in 1935 to preserve the collection of the industrialist Henry Clay Frick. The collection consists of 14th- to 19th-century European paintings, as well as other pieces of European fine and decorative art. It is located at the Henry Clay Frick House, a Beaux-Arts mansion designed for Henry Clay Frick. The Frick also houses the Frick Art Research Library, an art history research center established by Frick's daughter Helen Clay Frick in 1920, which contains sales catalogs, books, periodicals, and photographs.

The museum dates to 1920, when the trustees of Frick's estate formed the Frick Collection Inc. to care for his art collection, which he had bequeathed for public use. After Frick's wife Adelaide Frick died in 1931, John Russell Pope converted the Frick House into a museum, which opened on December 16, 1935. The museum acquired additional works of art over the years, and it expanded the house in 1977 to accommodate increasing visitation. Following fundraising campaigns in the 2000s, a further expansion was announced in the 2010s. From 2021 until March 2024, during the renovation of the Frick House, the Frick Madison operated at the former Whitney Museum building at 945 Madison Avenue. The Frick House reopened in April 2025.

The Frick has about 1,500 pieces in its collection as of 2021. Artists with works in the collection include Bellini, Fragonard, Gainsborough, Goya, Holbein, Rembrandt, Titian, Turner, Velázquez, Vermeer, and Whistler. The museum has gradually acquired additional pieces over the years to supplement the paintings in Frick's original collection. In addition to its permanent collection, the museum has hosted small temporary exhibitions on narrowly defined topics, as well as academic symposiums, concerts, and classes. The Frick Collection typically has up to 300,000 visitors annually and has an endowment fund to support its programming. Commentary on the museum over the years has been largely positive, particularly in relation to the works themselves and their juxtaposition with the Frick House.

== History ==
Henry Clay Frick was a coke and steel magnate. As early as 1870, he had hung pictures throughout his house in Broadford, Pennsylvania. Frick acquired the first painting in his permanent collection, Luis Jiménez's In the Louvre, in 1880, after moving to Pittsburgh. He did not begin buying paintings in large numbers until the mid-1890s, and he began devoting significant amounts of time to his collection. This made Frick one of several prominent American businessmen who also collected art, along with figures such as Henry Havemeyer and J. P. Morgan. In explaining why he collected art, Frick said, "I can make money... I cannot make pictures." He curated his collection with the help of Joseph Duveen, 1st Baron Duveen.

When the Frick family moved from Pittsburgh to New York City in 1905, they leased the William H. Vanderbilt House at 640 Fifth Avenue, and Frick expanded his collection during that time. The collection was spread across their homes in New York, Pennsylvania, and Massachusetts. Thomas Hastings of Carrère and Hastings designed Frick's permanent house at 1 East 70th Street, which was completed in 1914. The house had been designed with the collection in mind. James Howard Bridge, Frick's personal assistant, was hired as the house's curator in 1914 and worked at the house for fourteen years. Frick, who was known for being especially particular in his tastes, spent an estimated $10 million to acquire pieces during his lifetime. Duveen opened four art-purchasing accounts for Frick, including two accounts specifically for art from Morgan's estate.

=== Creation ===
==== Establishment of Frick Collection Inc. ====
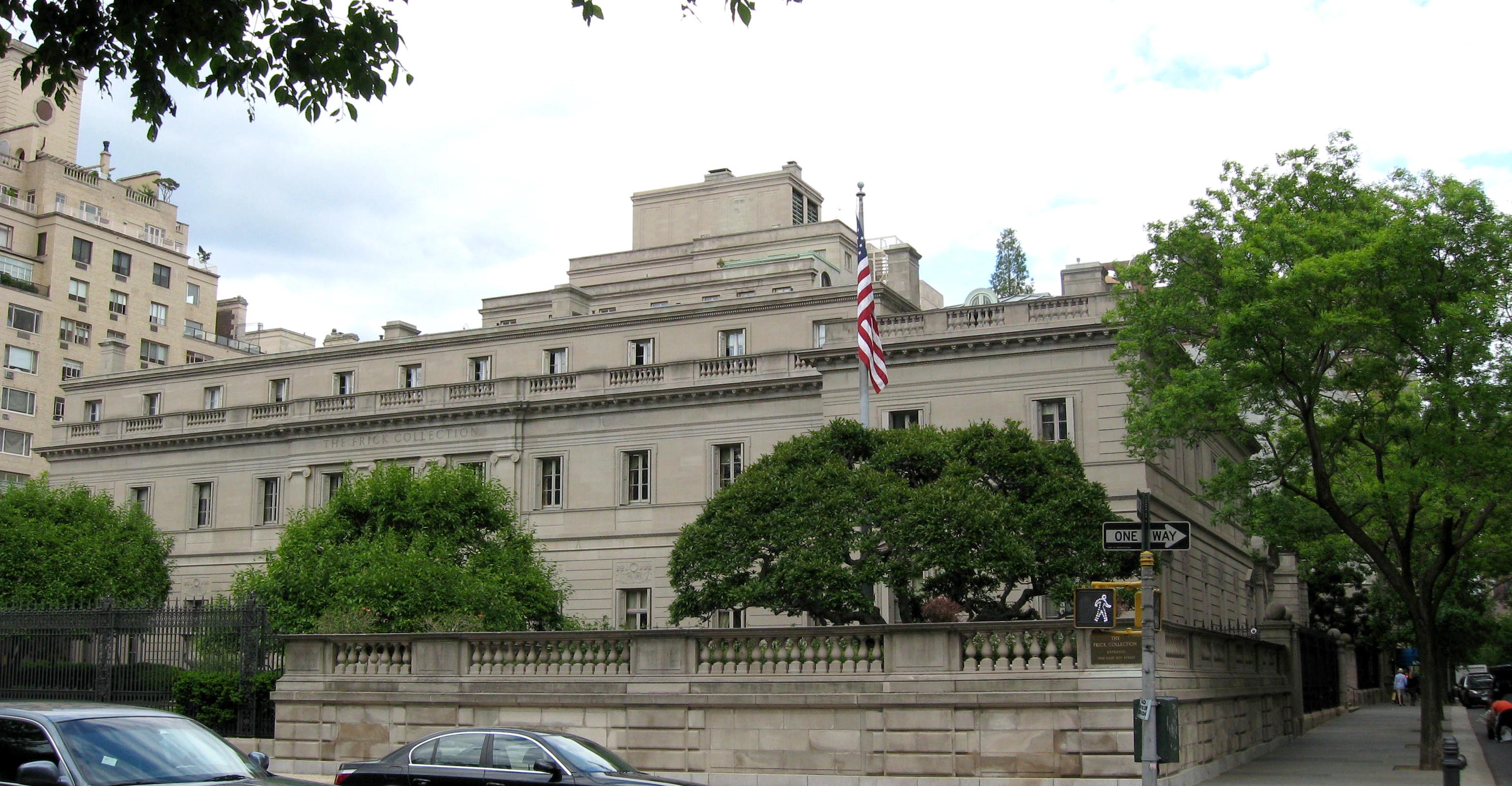
When Frick died in 1919, he bequeathed the Henry Clay Frick House on Fifth Avenue as a public museum for his art collection.

Frick died in 1919 at the age of 69, bequeathing the house as a public museum for his art collection. His widow Adelaide Howard Childs Frick continued living in the mansion with her daughter Helen; if Adelaide died or moved away, the house would be converted to a public museum. At the time, the collection alone was worth $30 million, and Frick also provided a $15 million endowment for the maintenance of the collection. Nine people, including Adelaide, Helen, and Helen's brother Childs, were named as trustees of his estate; Childs served as the head of the Frick estate's board of trustees until his death in 1965. Per the terms of Frick's will, the trustees moved to incorporate Frick's art collection in April 1920, submitting articles of incorporation to the New York state government. The Frick Collection Inc. was incorporated that month.

The New York and Pennsylvania state governments fought over which government should collect taxes from Frick's estate. Amid this dispute, the collection was reassessed at $13 million in 1921; this figure was repeated in a revised appraisal of Frick's estate that was filed with the New York state government in 1923. Meanwhile, Helen Frick studied plans for the Witt Library in London in the early 1920s, as she wanted to create a library for Frick's personal collection. Helen catalogued most of the collection over the next decade. The Frick Art Research Library, originally named the Frick Art Reference Library, was organized at the mansion after Frick's death, and a dedicated library building opened the next year. During the 1920s, the library added thousands of volumes and photographs to its holdings. Over the years, four additional trustees had to be appointed after their predecessors died.

==== Opening of museum ====
After Adelaide Frick's death in October 1931, the trustees were finally allowed to open the house to the public; they announced in January 1933 that the collection would likely open to the public within a year. John Russell Pope was hired to alter and enlarge the house. Frederick Mortimer Clapp, who had joined the Frick Collection as an advisor in 1931, was hired as the museum's first director. Work on the mansion began in December 1933. A new library wing was constructed on 71st Street to replace the original library. Other modifications included a new storage vault and renovations of the Frick family's living space. The museum's opening, originally scheduled for 1934, was postponed because of the complexity of the construction project. The Frick estate also sued the city government in 1935 to obtain a property-tax exemption for the museum, and the taxes were waived the next year, as the Frick Collection was a public museum.

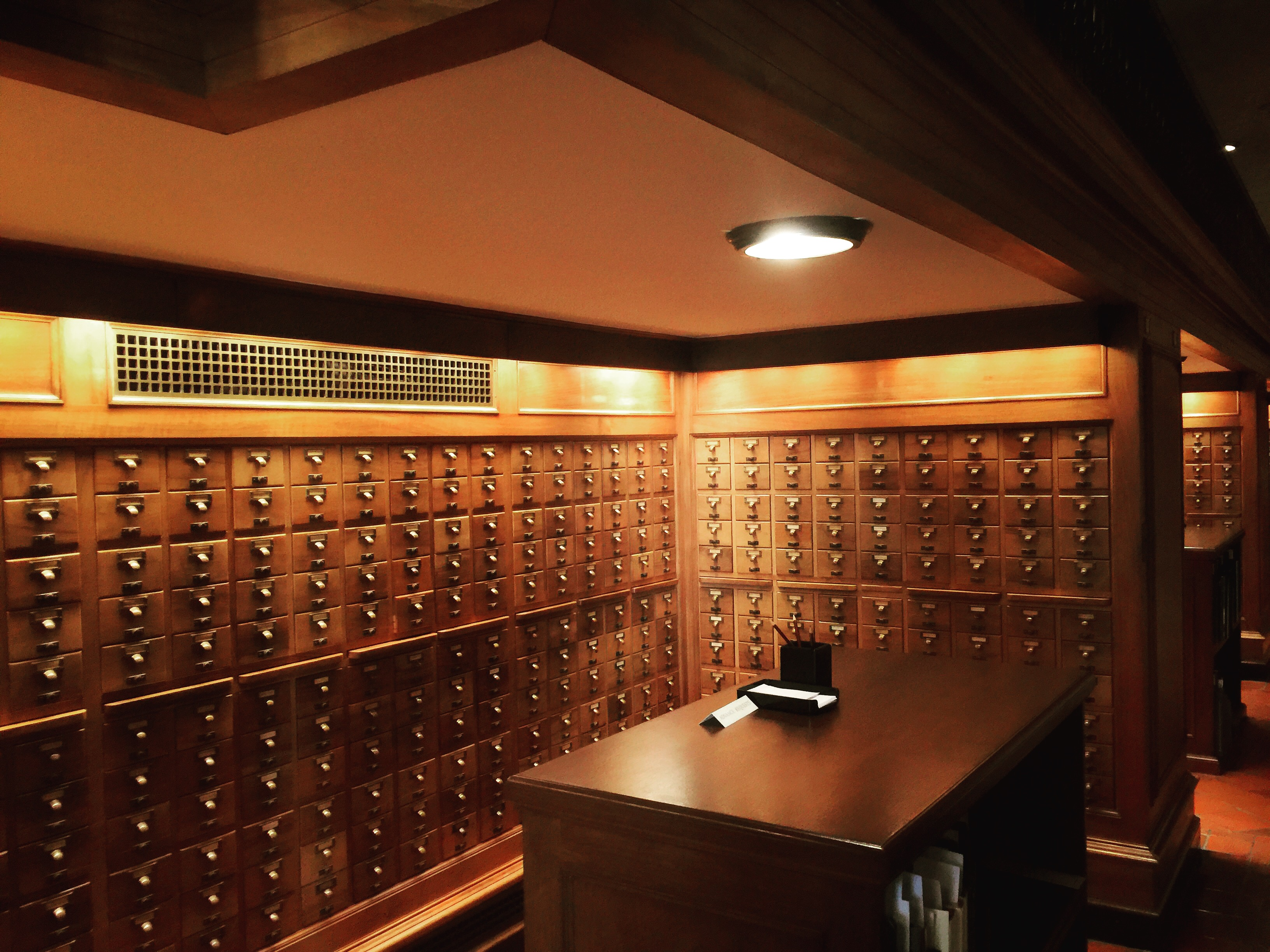
The Frick Art Research Library reopened in 1935.

When the rebuilt library opened in January 1935, it had 200,000 photographs, 18,000 catalogs of art sales, and 45,000 books. The museum itself had a soft opening on December 11, 1935; the preview was noteworthy enough that the names of 700 visitors were published in that day's New York Herald Tribune. The Frick Collection officially opened to the public five days later on December 16. When it opened, the museum did not charge admission fees, but staff distributed timed-entry tickets to prevent crowding. Although about 600 tickets were distributed daily to people who showed up in person, other visitors had to make reservations several weeks in advance due to high demand. Ropes were placed throughout the house to force visitors to follow a specific path. The galleries were originally closed on holidays, Sundays, and for a month in the middle of the year. Artworks were arranged based on how they blended in with the house's ambiance, rather than being arranged by year.

=== 1930s to 1960s ===
Within a year of the museum's opening, demand had declined enough that officials decided to scale down, and then eliminate, its timed-entry ticketing system. The ropes throughout the house were taken down, and visitors were allowed to visit the Frick House's rooms in any order. Museum officials also presented lectures five days a week during the late 1930s, and they started hosting afternoon concert series in November 1938; these concerts and lectures continued throughout Clapp's tenure at the museum. Clapp also obtained fresh flowers each day and placed them in the first-floor galleries for esthetic purposes. Three magnolia trees were planted on the grounds in 1939. To expand their land holdings, museum officials bought a neighboring townhouse at 9 East 70th Street in 1940 and used that building as storage space.

Museum officials constructed a vault in 1941 to protect the artwork from air raids. During World War II, the museum continued to host visitors, but some rooms were closed, and more than five dozen paintings and all of the sculptures were moved into storage. Museum officials took these pieces out of storage in May 1945 and restored them; other artworks in the house were rearranged and cleaned as well. The Frick acquired another townhouse at 7 East 70th Street in 1947 and replaced it with a service wing. By the late 1940s, the museum had cumulatively spent about $2.9 million in acquisitions since Frick's death. When John D. Rockefeller Jr. offered to donate several pieces of artwork in 1948, Helen Frick objected, arguing that the museum only accepted gifts from Frick family members. In the lawsuit that followed, a New York Supreme Court judge ruled that the terms of Frick's will did not prevent the museum from accepting external gifts; the court's Appellate Division upheld this ruling. Rockefeller, who had been on the board of trustees, resigned amid the dispute.

Clapp resigned in 1951 and was replaced by the museum's assistant director Franklin M. Biebel. Biebel established a decorative-arts conservation program, and the number of annual visitors nearly doubled under his tenure. The museum's collection remained largely unchanged over the next several years, as Helen Frick opposed any expansions, saying that her father would not have wanted items to be added. Helen resigned from the museum's board of trustees in 1961, after the board finally voted to accept Rockefeller's gift. Assistant director Harry D. M. Grier replaced Biebel, becoming the museum's third director in 1964. By the mid-1960s, the Frick had 160 portraits, 80 sculptures, and various other items in its collection. The Frick was open six days a week (except in August, when it was closed) and was still free to enter. The collection was small compared to that of the Metropolitan Museum of Art, which at the time had 365,000 items. Edgar Munhall was hired as the museum's first chief curator in 1965, a position he would hold for thirty-five years. As part of a master plan in 1967, the Frick's trustees drew up plans for an annex at 7 and 9 East 70th Street.

=== 1970s to 1990s ===
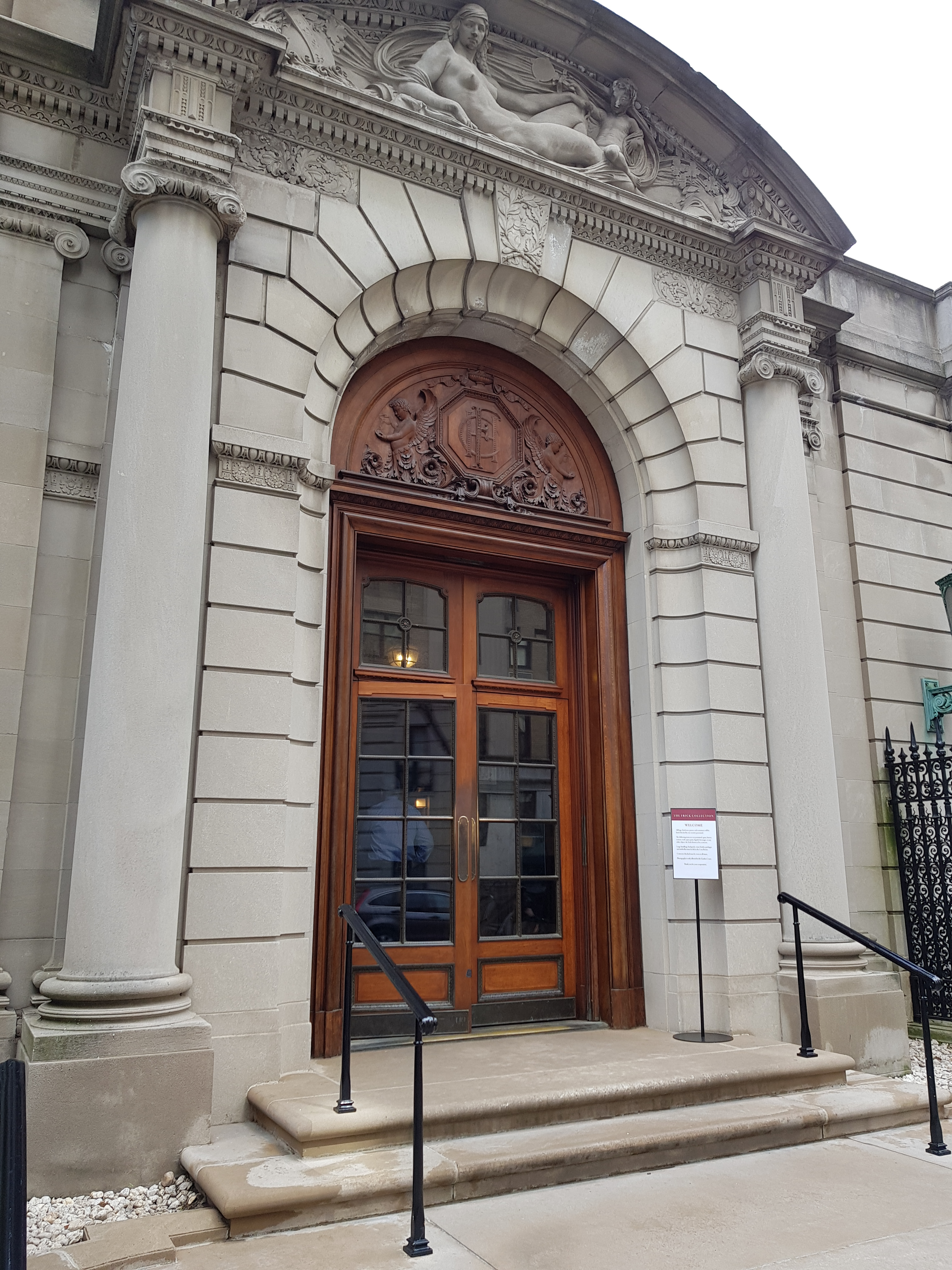
Entrance to the Frick Collection

By the early 1970s, the museum recorded about 800 daily visitors and employed 75 staff members. The next year, the museum began asking visitors to pay an optional admission fee due to rising taxes and expenses. After Grier was killed in a traffic accident in 1972, Everett Fahy was appointed as the museum's fourth director in 1973. The museum announced plans to construct an annex at 5–9 East 70th Street. After the New York City Landmarks Preservation Commission (LPC) expressed concerns over the fact that the expansion would require the demolition of the Widener House at 5 East 70th Street, the museum announced a plan for a "temporary garden" on the 70th Street lots, which the LPC approved. The original annex was canceled that November, and Frick officials subsequently decided to build a one-story wing on the Widener House's site. The annex had been proposed because, at the time, the mansion could accommodate only 250 people at once.

Under Fahy's tenure, the museum began hosting more temporary exhibits, which it had seldom held before Fahy took over. The Frick began charging admission for the first time in 1976. The annex was completed the next year, along with a garden, designed by British landscape architect Russell Page. The Frick renovated the Boucher Room and cleaned and rearranged its paintings during the following decade. By the mid-1980s, the museum displayed 169 works of art, and the galleries occupied 16 rooms. The museum periodically hosted chamber music performances in the Frick House's courtyard. It was relatively low-profile compared to others in New York City, only sporadically expanding its collection and hosting small temporary exhibitions. After Helen Frick died in 1984, the museum took over responsibility for the Frick Art Research Library; initially, the library had no endowment as Helen had not provided anything for the library in her will. Ceiling lights were installed in the Fragonard and Boucher rooms in the 1980s.

Charles Ryskamp, the former director of the Pierpont Morgan Library, was appointed as the Frick's fifth director in December 1986 after Fahy's resignation, though he did not assume that position for another six months. Under Ryskamp's directorship, some of the paintings were rearranged or brought out of storage. By the 1990s, the art reference library was low on funds; the library had a $25 million endowment by 1993, and the Frick began charging "frequent commercial users" of the library that year. Through the 1990s, the Frick banned all children under the age of 10, as well as unaccompanied minors between ages 10 and 15, and the museum also did not have a café. The New York City government passed a law banning public institutions from discriminating by age in 1993, which would have forced the museum to start admitting children. Museum officials requested a waiver, saying that they would have to install barriers if children were allowed, and they received such a waiver in 1995. In addition, further lighting upgrades were made in the mid-1990s.

Ryskamp announced his retirement in 1997. After Samuel Sachs II was named as the museum's sixth director that May, the trustees tasked him with raising funds. Under Sachs's directorship, the museum launched a website in the 1990s, and replaced the lighting and hosted additional special exhibitions. Sachs also contemplated expanding the exhibition space, adding a café, and relocating the entrance to the house's garden. In addition, the museum began providing complimentary audio guides for the mansion and artworks and, in the early 21st century, added the Bloomberg Connects smartphone app. Museum officials also began allowing parties to be hosted in the Frick House. A group named Friends of the Fellows of the Frick Collection was formed to raise interest in the museum.

=== 2000s and 2010s ===
Colin Bailey was appointed as chief curator in 2000 after Munhall resigned. During the late 1990s, the Helen Clay Frick Foundation proposed moving its archives in Pittsburgh to the Frick Collection's archives, prompting an intra-family debate over whether the collections should be merged. The foundation's collection ultimately was split between the two cities in 2001, and most of the objects were sent to New York City. After attendance dropped following the September 11 attacks that year, the Andrew W. Mellon Foundation provided $270,000, in part to fund extended hours on Fridays. Sachs announced in January 2003 that he would resign as the museum's director in eight months, as the board of trustees had not renewed his contract. At the time of Sachs's resignation, the museum recorded 350,000 annual visitors, 20 percent more than in 1997, but it was running at a $1 million annual deficit. Annexes to the museum were proposed in 2001, 2005, and 2008, but all of these plans were canceled because it would have required an extended closure of the museum and still would not have provided sufficient space.

The art scholar Anne L. Poulet was hired in August 2003 as the Frick's first female director, and the museum was reorganized as a tax-exempt public charity shortly after Poulet became the director. Under Poulet's tenure, she replaced lighting in several galleries and rearranged some of the pieces. She also raised $55 million for renovations; the museum's facilities had become dated, and the basement exhibition space was no longer sufficient. Because of the Frick's classification as a charity, the museum had to raise a third of its budget from donations. The Frick created programs to attract major donors and art collectors, and it began charging admission fees for concerts in 2005. During the 2000s decade, the Frick did not acquire many additional items. In contrast to larger museums, it generally hosted small, detailed exhibits, though the number of short-term exhibitions at the Frick increased during the decade. Further restorations of the museum's galleries took place through the late 2000s to attract visitors.

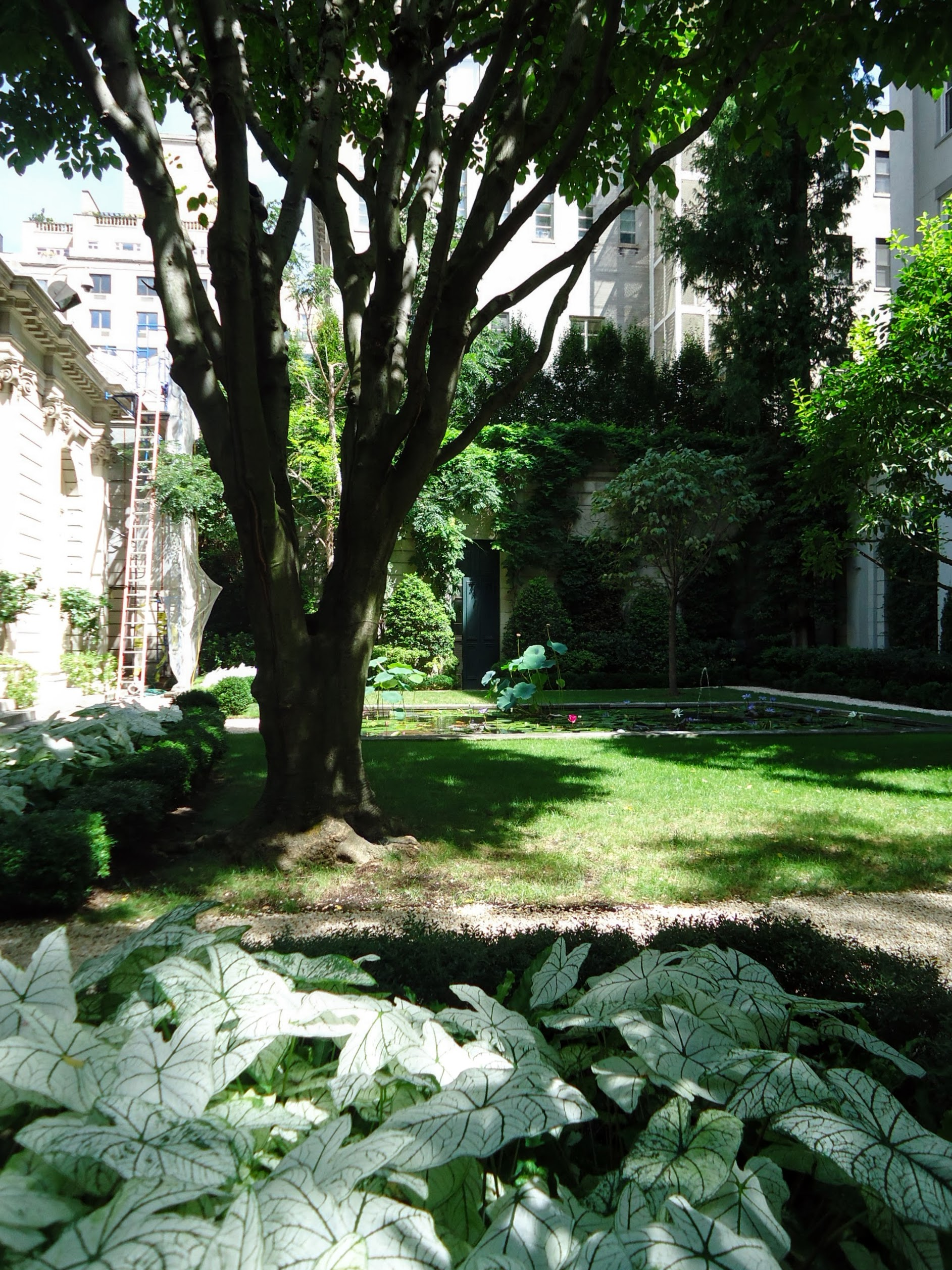
A plan to expand the museum in 2014 failed because of opposition to demolishing the 70th Street garden (pictured).

Poulet announced her retirement in September 2010, and Ian Wardropper was hired as the museum's director in 2011. A sculpture gallery, designed by Davis Brody Bond, opened at the Frick House in December 2011, becoming the first new gallery at the museum in three decades. Bailey resigned as the chief curator in 2013, and Xavier F. Salomon was hired as the chief curator the same year. During the 2010s, the Frick began raising $290 million for its renovation. The collection had reached more than 1,100 works by the mid-2010s. (Note: A New York Times article from 2014 described the collection as having 1,200 works, while a Wall Street Journal article from the same year gives a figure of 1,115 works.) In addition, the museum was hosting an average of five temporary exhibits per year. The Frick House's facilities were not adequate for the museum's modern needs. For example, paintings had to be carried into the museum through the house's front door, and portraits had to be placed in storage whenever the Frick hosted a visiting show. The concerts at the museum sometimes sold out as well.

In 2014, the museum announced plans for a six-story annex on 70th Street designed by Davis Brody Bond. Russell Page's garden on 70th Street would have been demolished to make way for the annex; this prompted opposition from residents and preservationists, and the Frick announced in June 2015 that it would draw up new designs. To attract younger visitors, the museum began hosting free events in the mid-2010s, such as First Fridays. The Frick hired Annabelle Selldorf to design a revised expansion plan for the museum, which was announced in April 2018; the LPC approved Selldorf's plans that June. The Frick then sought to relocate to the Solomon R. Guggenheim Museum temporarily, but the Guggenheim was available for only four months. By September 2018, the Frick was negotiating to take over the Whitney Museum's space at 945 Madison Avenue; the Frick finalized a two-year lease for that building in 2020.

=== 2020s to present ===
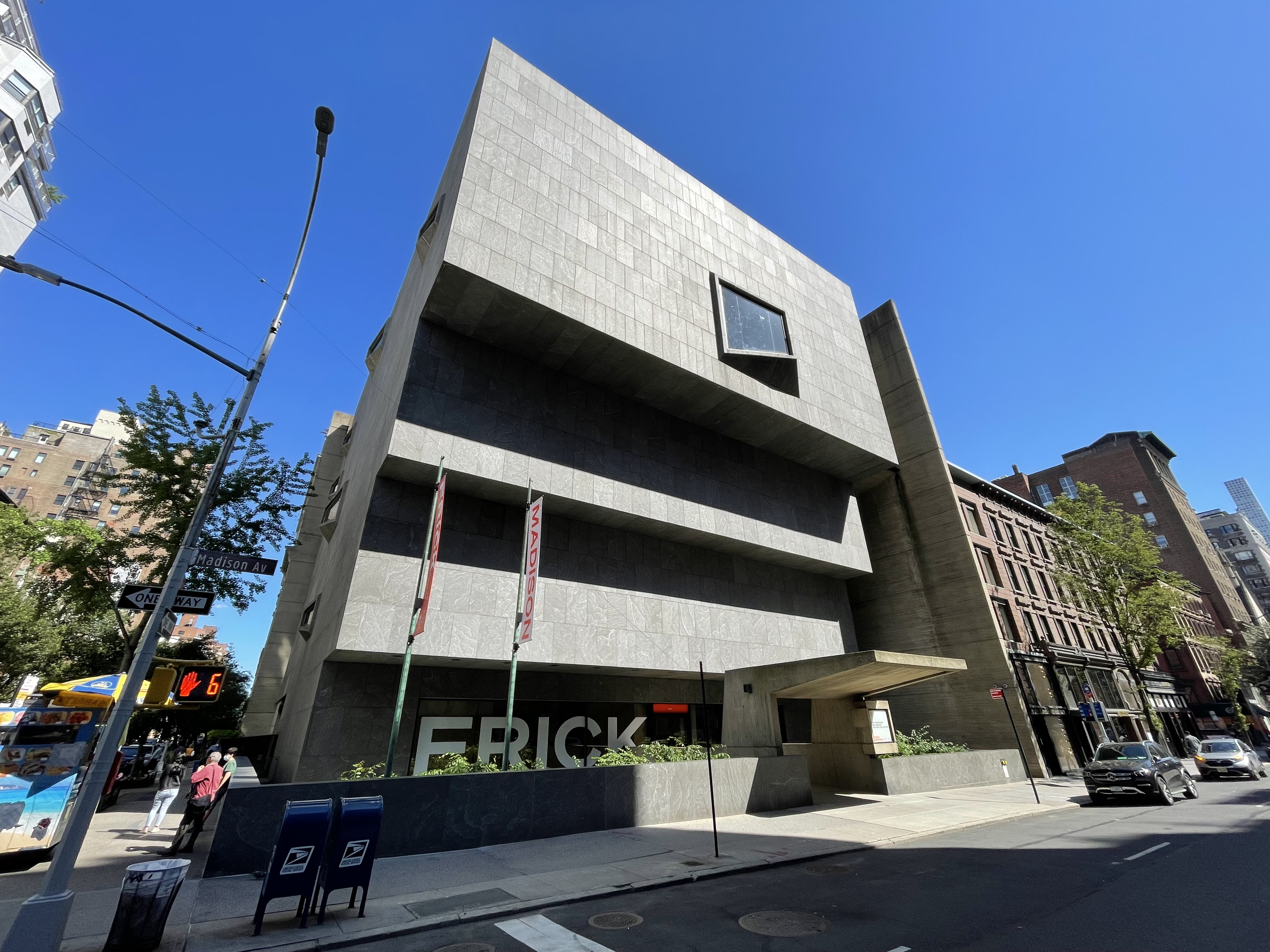
The Frick moved to 945 Madison Avenue between 2021 and 2024.

The Frick closed in mid-March 2020 due to the COVID-19 pandemic in New York City; the opening of the temporary location was delayed due to the pandemic. The museum's collection was moved to the Whitney building at 945 Madison Avenue, which reopened as the Frick Madison in March 2021. The Frick Madison housed the museum's old masters collection, including 104 paintings, along with sculptures, vases, and clocks. Most of the 1,500-piece collection of artwork was placed in storage at 945 Madison Avenue, and about 300 works were placed on display. At the Frick Madison, known in architecture circles as "the Frickney", the artwork was exhibited against stark dark gray walls, in contrast to the Frick House's ornate decoration; a juxtaposition that critic Thomas de Monchaux called "the greatest concurrence of art and architecture in the history of New York City." The paintings were also grouped according to their age and region of origin. The Frick Madison also included a café.

The museum had raised $242 million for its capital campaign by the end of 2023. Wardropper announced in January 2024 that he would resign the following year, after the Frick House's renovation was complete. The Frick Madison closed on March 3, 2024. The Henry Clay Frick House and Frick Art Research Library were originally expected to reopen in late 2024, but this was pushed back. Some existing exhibition spaces were rearranged as well, and a restaurant and auditorium were added. In September 2024, the Frick hired Axel Rüger, the head of the Royal Academy of Arts in London, to serve as the museum's director beginning in 2025. The Frick Collection reopened on April 17, 2025, and its first-ever restaurant, Westmoreland, opened that June. To promote the renovated museum, the Frick commissioned a video featuring the comedian Steve Martin. Solomon resigned as chief curator in late 2025 and was replaced by Aimee Ng that year.

== Collection ==
The Frick has a collection of old master paintings and furniture housed in 19 galleries of varying size within the former residence. Frick ultimately acquired a variety of European paintings, Renaissance bronzes, French clocks, and a set of porcelains. Toward the end of Frick's life, he focused on porcelains, sculptures, and furniture. Although Frick made over a thousand acquisitions over his lifetime, he resold most of the things he bought. The original collection contained 635 pieces of art or decorations when Frick died. When the museum opened, it displayed 136 or about 200 paintings in addition to porcelains, enamels, and bronzes. There were also 80 sculptures on display.

Helen Clay Frick and the board of trustees expanded the collection after his death; in 2006, the New York Times estimated that about 30 percent of the collection had been acquired after Frick died. Nonetheless, until 1948, the museum accepted donations of art only from Frick family members. The museum can lend works acquired after Frick's death, but not works that he owned in his lifetime; this restriction has prevented works from appearing in other museums' exhibitions. The Frick is also prohibited from selling items in its collection and seldom acquires new works. Some of the works are normally not visible to the public but can be displayed as necessary. The Frick has sometimes borrowed paintings for long periods, including a portrait of Cosimo de' Medici that was displayed in the museum from 1970 to 1989. Purchases of new art were funded by the museum's endowment until 2016, when the museum's trustees established an acquisitions fund.

As of 2025, the museum has 1,800 pieces in its collection, including both paintings and other objects. Prior to the museum's 2020s renovation, it normally displayed 470 objects, which were exhibited in 15 galleries. An additional 10 galleries were built during the 2020s. Among the objects displayed in the expanded galleries are clocks and watches, in addition to portrait medals.

=== Visual arts collection ===
Frick's collection initially consisted of salon pieces and works by Barbizon School artists, and he bought 90 paintings from Charles Carstairs between 1895 and 1900 alone. He had begun to acquire other types of paintings by the end of the 19th century, and his acquisitions during the 1900s were increasingly composed of Old Master artworks. By the early 1910s, his collection consisted largely of English and Dutch paintings, with scattered French and Spanish paintings; a magazine article from that time described him as having relatively little interest in Italian Renaissance work. The paintings ranged from the 14th to 19th centuries, and many of the paintings depicted women. There were some chronological gaps in the original collection: for example, there were no 17th-century French paintings when the museum opened, even as the museum had both older and newer French paintings. Aside from one painting by Giovanni Bellini, Frick did not buy religious works or nudes.

When Frick died, he was variously cited as having collected 103, 137, "about 140", or 250 paintings. Some of the original paintings in Frick's personal collection were discovered to be forgeries after his death, while other paintings were found to be misattributed. Artists with works in the museum's collection have included:

- Giovanni Bellini
- François Boucher
- Agnolo Bronzino
- Cimabue
- John Constable
- Jean-Baptiste-Camille Corot
- Aelbert Cuyp
- Jacques-Louis David
- Gerard David
- Jean-Honoré Fragonard
- El Greco
- Gentile da Fabriano
- Thomas Gainsborough
- Francisco Goya
- Frans Hals
- Meindert Hobbema
- William Hogarth
- Hans Holbein the Younger
- John Hoppner
- Jean Auguste Dominique Ingres
- Thomas Lawrence
- Jean-François Millet
- Bartolomé Esteban Murillo
- Jean-Marc Nattier
- Henry Raeburn
- Rembrandt
- Pierre-Auguste Renoir
- Joshua Reynolds
- George Romney
- Titian
- J. M. W. Turner
- Johannes Vermeer
- Paolo Veronese
- Diego Velázquez
- Anthony van Dyck
- Jan van Eyck
- Jacob van Ruisdael
- James McNeill Whistler

Several artists, including Holbein, Vermeer, Rembrandt, Turner, Gainsborough, Van Dyck, Fragonard, and Boucher, painted multiple pieces that are in the collection. Included in the modern collection are Fragonard's The Progress of Love, three Vermeer paintings including Mistress and Maid, two van Ruisdael paintings including Quay at Amsterdam, El Greco's Christ Driving the Money Changers from the Temple, Titian's Portrait of a Man in a Red Cap, one of Rembrandt's self-portraits, and della Francesca's St. John the Evangelist.

==== Notable works in the original collection ====
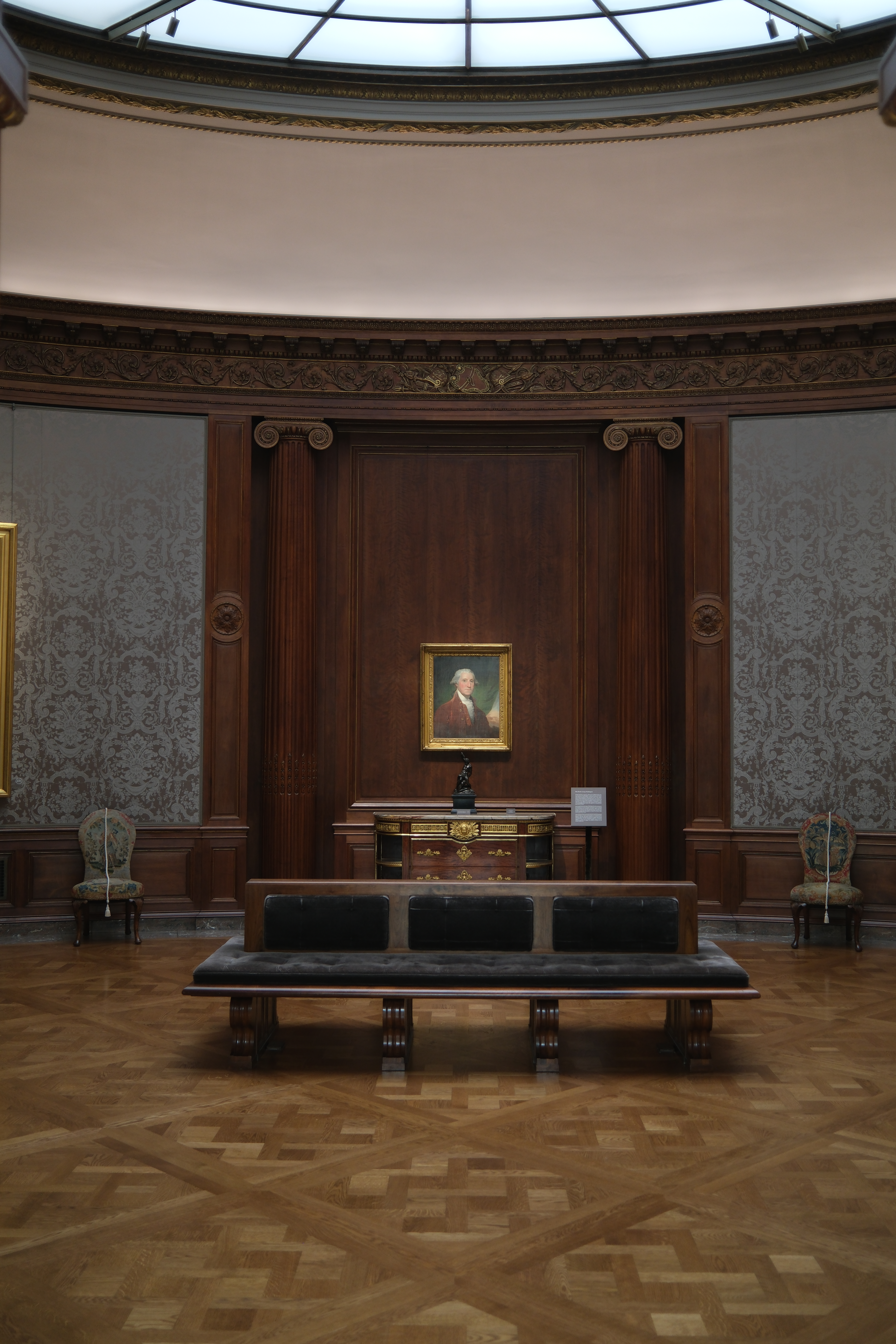
Hall housing Gilbert Stuart's portrait of George Washington

Some of the earliest works in Frick's collection were portraits of his family, created for his Pittsburgh residence. At the beginning of the 20th century, Frick bought works such as Rembrandt's Portrait of a Young Artist (possibly the first Old Master painting in the collection), Jean-Baptiste-Camille Corot's Ville d'Avray, Constant Troyon's A Pasture in Normandy, and Vermeer's Girl Interrupted at Her Music. From 1905 to 1915, Frick also acquired paintings such as Hals's Portrait of a Woman, Velázquez's Portrait of Philip IV in Fraga, Rembrandt's A Dutch Merchant, and Rembrandt's The Polish Rider.

After Frick had finished his own mansion, he brought over several paintings of his firstborn daughter Martha, who had died in her childhood. He also obtained 14 Fragonard panels from the collection of J. P. Morgan and moved the panels to his house's drawing room. At the time of the house's completion, he owned paintings by such artists as El Greco, Goya, Hals, Rembrandt, Romney, Titian, Anthony van Dyck, and Velázquez. In the late 1910s, Frick acquired additional pieces from outside the Morgan collection, such as Hans Holbein's portrait of Thomas Cromwell, Rubens's Portrait of the Marquis Ambrose de Spinola, Rembrandt's An Old Woman Reflecting Over the Lecture, and Gainsborough's Mall between 1915 and 1916 alone. He also bought four Boucher panels, although he turned down the opportunity to buy additional panels. From 1917 through 1919, Frick obtained several pieces of Boucher tapestry furniture, Van Dyck's Countess of Clanbrazil, Hals's Portrait of a Man, Vermeer's Mistress and Maid, and a Gilbert Stuart portrait of George Washington.

==== Notable acquisitions after Frick's death ====
In the half-century after Frick died, thirty objects were added to the original collection. After Frick's death but before the opening of the current museum, the Frick estate's trustees bought the Portrait of Comtesse d'Haussonville by Jean-Auguste-Dominique Ingres, as well as a painting by Duccio and the Coronation of the Virgin by Paolo Veneziano. The Giuseppe Bastiani painting Adoration of Magi was acquired in 1935. Works by Cimabue, Duccio, della Francesca, and Filippo Lippi entered the museum's collection for the first time between 1924 and 1950. Shortly after the museum opened, it acquired items such as a Renaissance-era panel by della Francesca, a portrait that Boucher painted of his wife, Jacques-Louis David's painting of a French noblewoman, Monet's Vétheuil in Winter, and a Paul Cézanne landscape. This was followed in the 1950s by three Italian Renaissance paintings, David's portrait of Antonio Bartolomeo Bruni, and Jan van Eyck's Virgin and Child, with Saints and Donor. The collection had only one 17th-century French work until the 1960s, when the museum obtained Claude Lorrain's painting of the Sermon on the Mount; the museum also obtained della Francesca's Crucifixion during that decade.

The Frick did not acquire anything between c. 1968 and 1991, when the museum obtained its first Jean-Antoine Watteau painting, Portal of Valenciennes. The museum's other acquisitions in the 1990s and 2000s included one of Corot's oil sketches, two of Jean-Baptiste Greuze's portraits, and Gabriel de Saint-Aubin's The Private Academy. After former director Ryskamp died in 2010, he bequeathed some of his collection to the Frick. The museum's other acquisitions in the 2010s included a self-portrait by Bartolomé Esteban Murillo that had been owned by Henry Clay Frick's grandson. In 2023, the Frick obtained Giovanni Battista Moroni's painting Portrait of a Lady, the first Renaissance-era portrait of a woman in the collection.

=== Other objects ===
The modern-day museum's collection includes numerous works of sculpture and porcelain, in addition to 18th-century French furniture, Limoges enamel, and Oriental rugs. The objects in the collection include 18th-century tapestries that belonged to Louis XV and Louis XVI of France.

Frick had acquired some objects from the J. P. Morgan estate specifically to complement the visual art in his collection. Some of these acquisitions included 18th-century French sculptures and furniture, a hawthorn beaker, and Chinese porcelains. In one case, Frick paid $1.5 million for some of Morgan's 44 enamels and 225 bronzes. He also acquired 40 Limoges enamels from Morgan's collection in 1919, one of the last things he would personally purchase. Outside of the Morgan collection, Frick also bought the bronzes Bust of a Jurist by Danese Cattaneo, Antonio Galli by Federico Brandani, and Duke of Alba by Jacques Jonghelinck. Although Frick had planned a sculpture gallery to his home in the late 1910s, the lack of other statuary caused him to cancel the plan. Duveen displayed numerous marble busts in the Frick House while Frick decided whether to buy them. Some of the furniture also came from Duveen.

A bust of Henry Clay Frick by Malvina Hoffman was gifted to the museum when it opened in 1935. Other acquisitions of sculpture in the mid-20th century included a Diana bust by Jean-Antoine Houdon, a 15th-century bronze figure of an angel, and a pair of 15th-century Italian marble busts. In the 1990s and 2000s, the Frick received Winthrop Edey's collection of timekeeping pieces, a 19th-century terracotta bust by Joseph Chinard, a marble bust by Houdon; a bust by Massimiliano Soldani Benzi, and a clock. Acquisitions since the 2010s have included 131 Meissen porcelains, as well as 28 objects from collector Alexis Gregory (including rare clocks and enamels).

=== Selected works ===
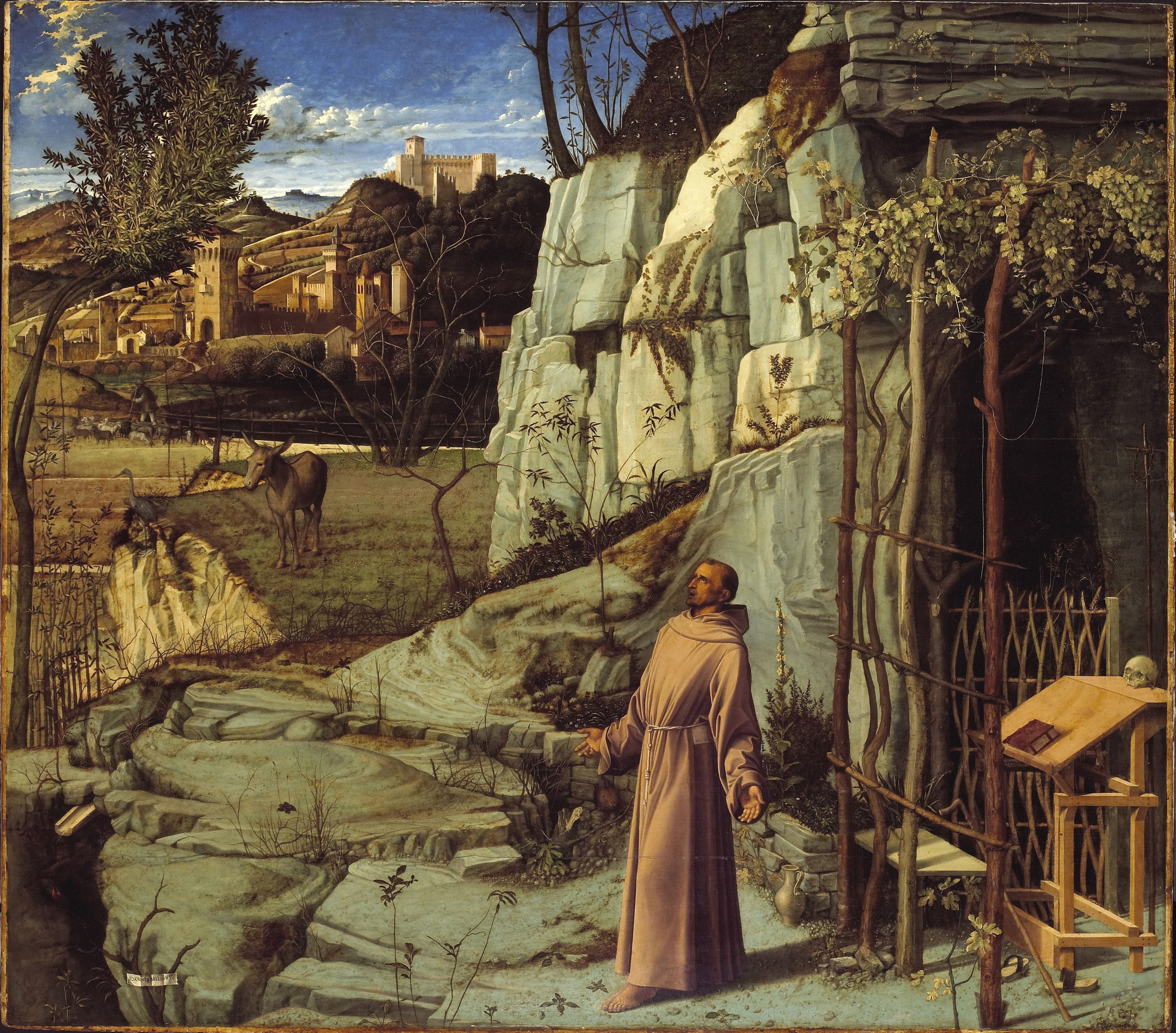
Giovanni Bellini, St. Francis in Ecstasy, 1478

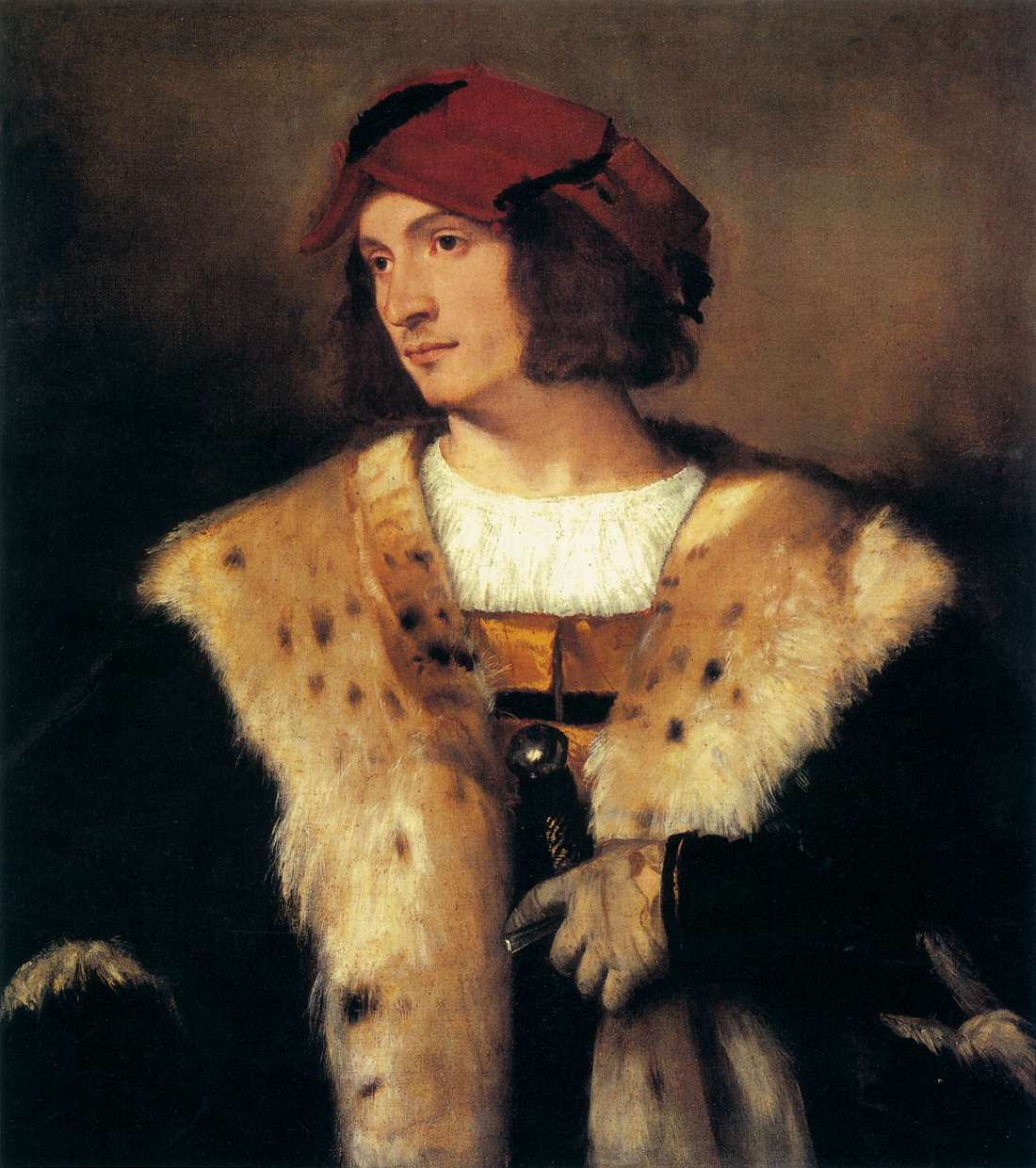
Titian, Portrait of a Man in a Red Cap, c. 1516

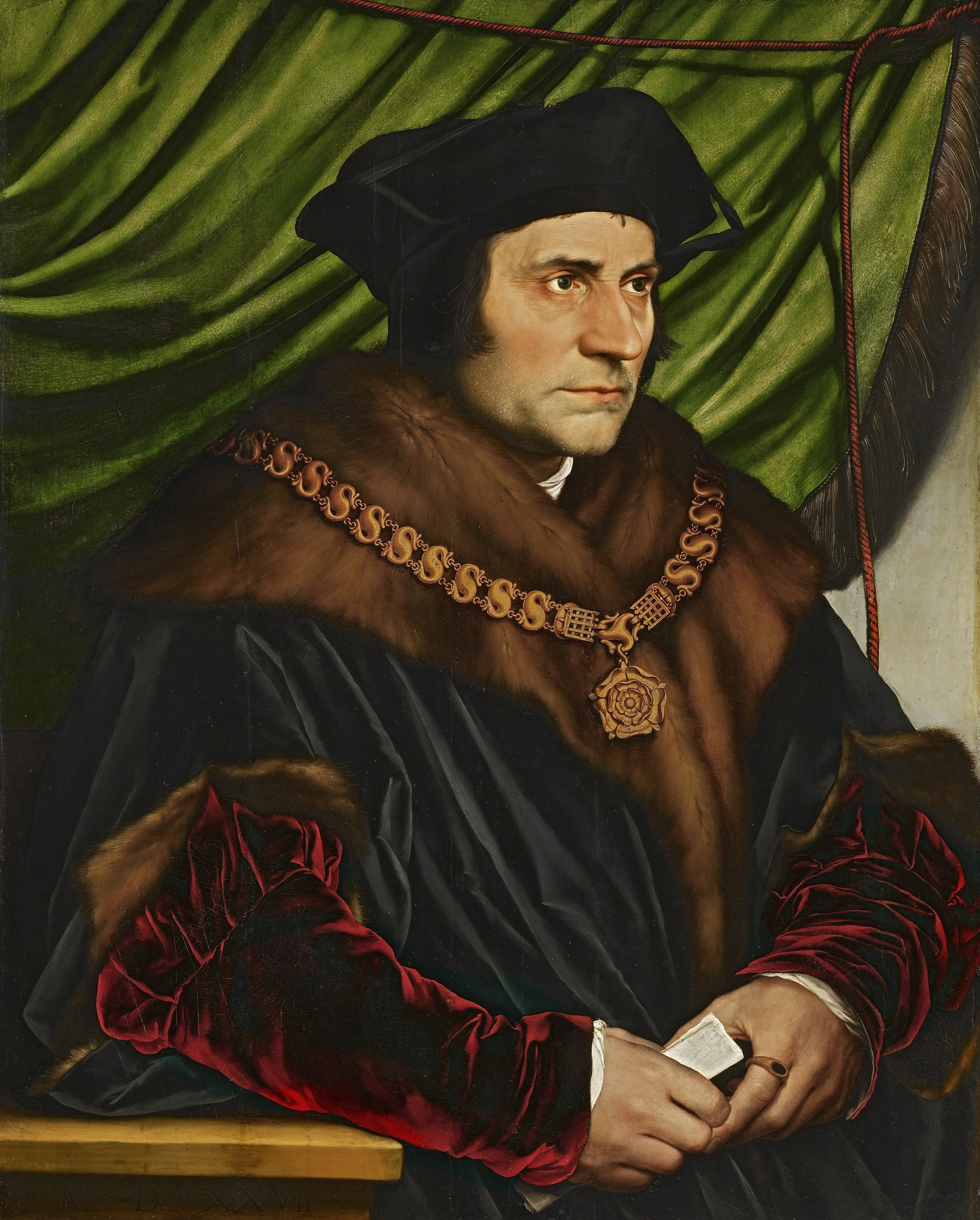
Hans Holbein the Younger, Portrait of Thomas More, 1527

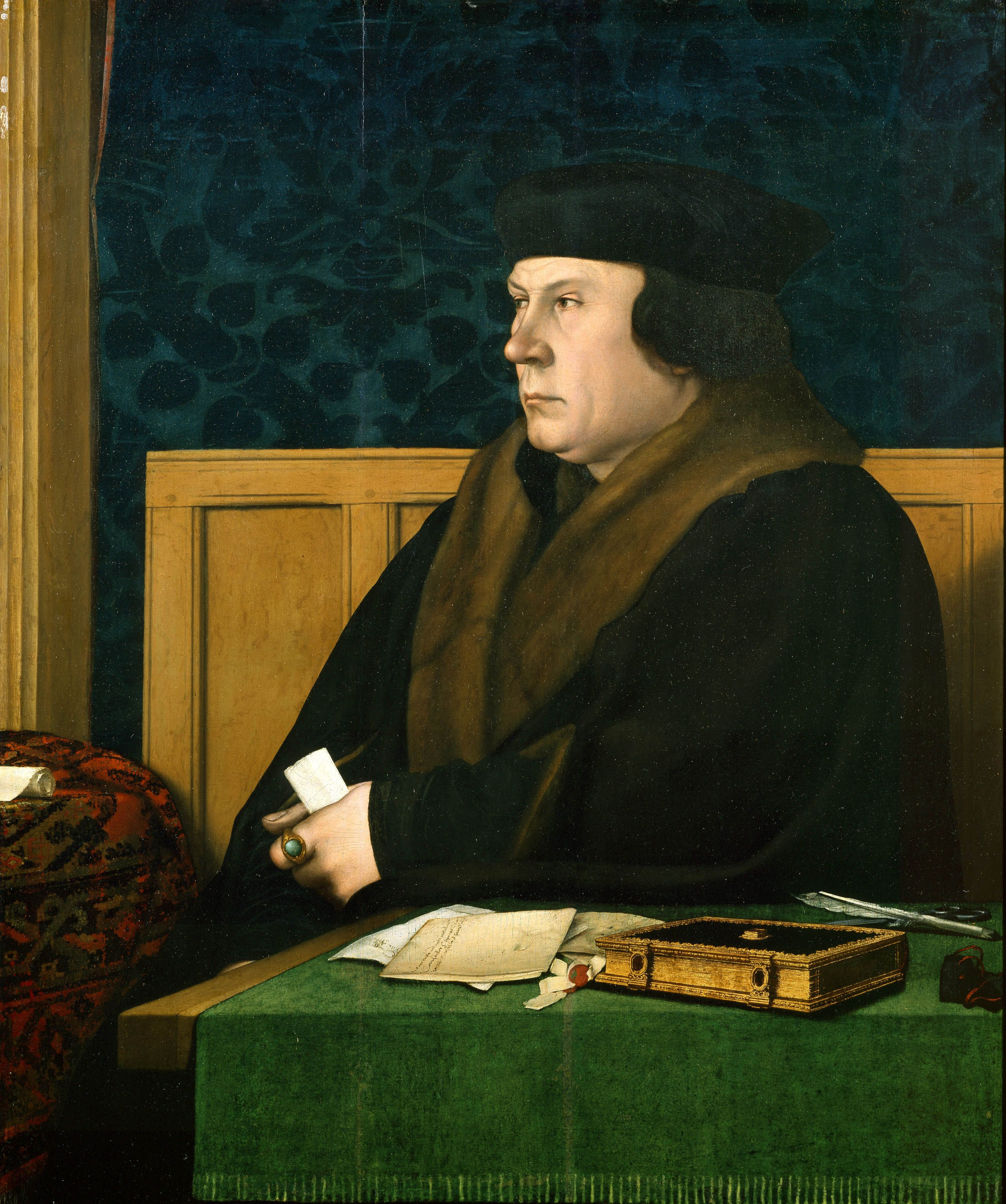
Hans Holbein the Younger, Portrait of Thomas Cromwell, 1532 or 1533

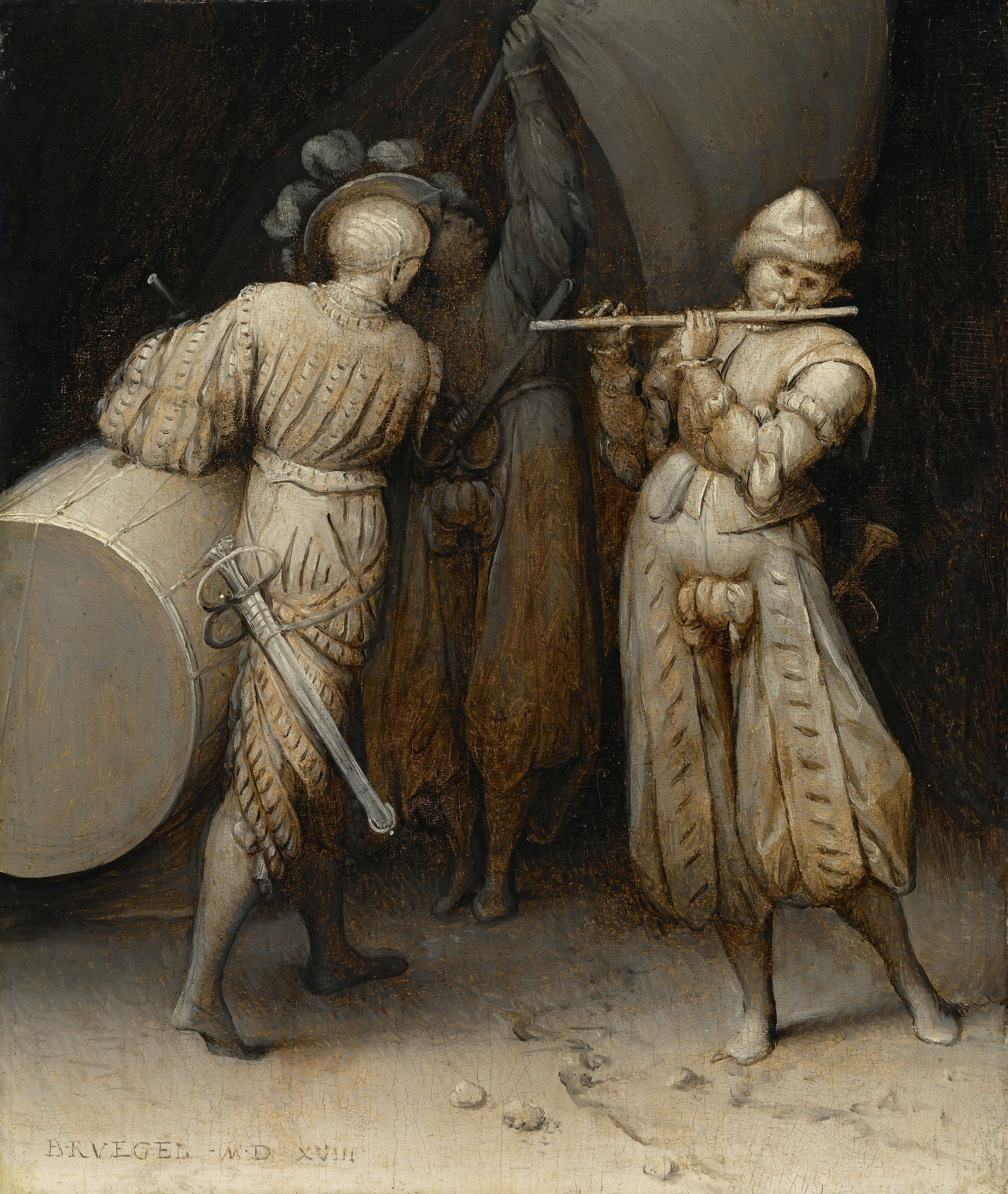
Pieter Bruegel the Elder, Three Soldiers, 1568

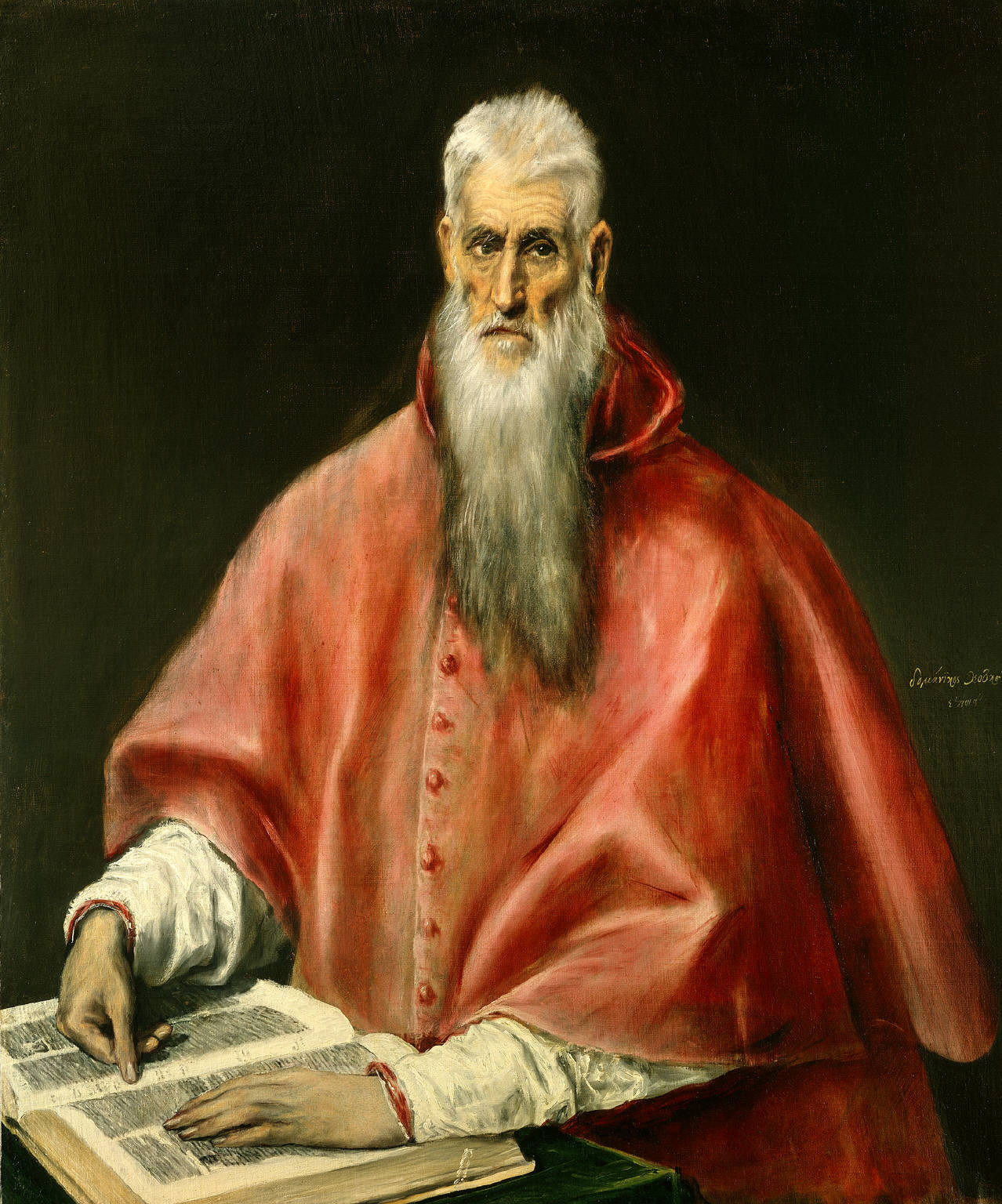
El Greco, Saint Jerome, c. 1590–1600

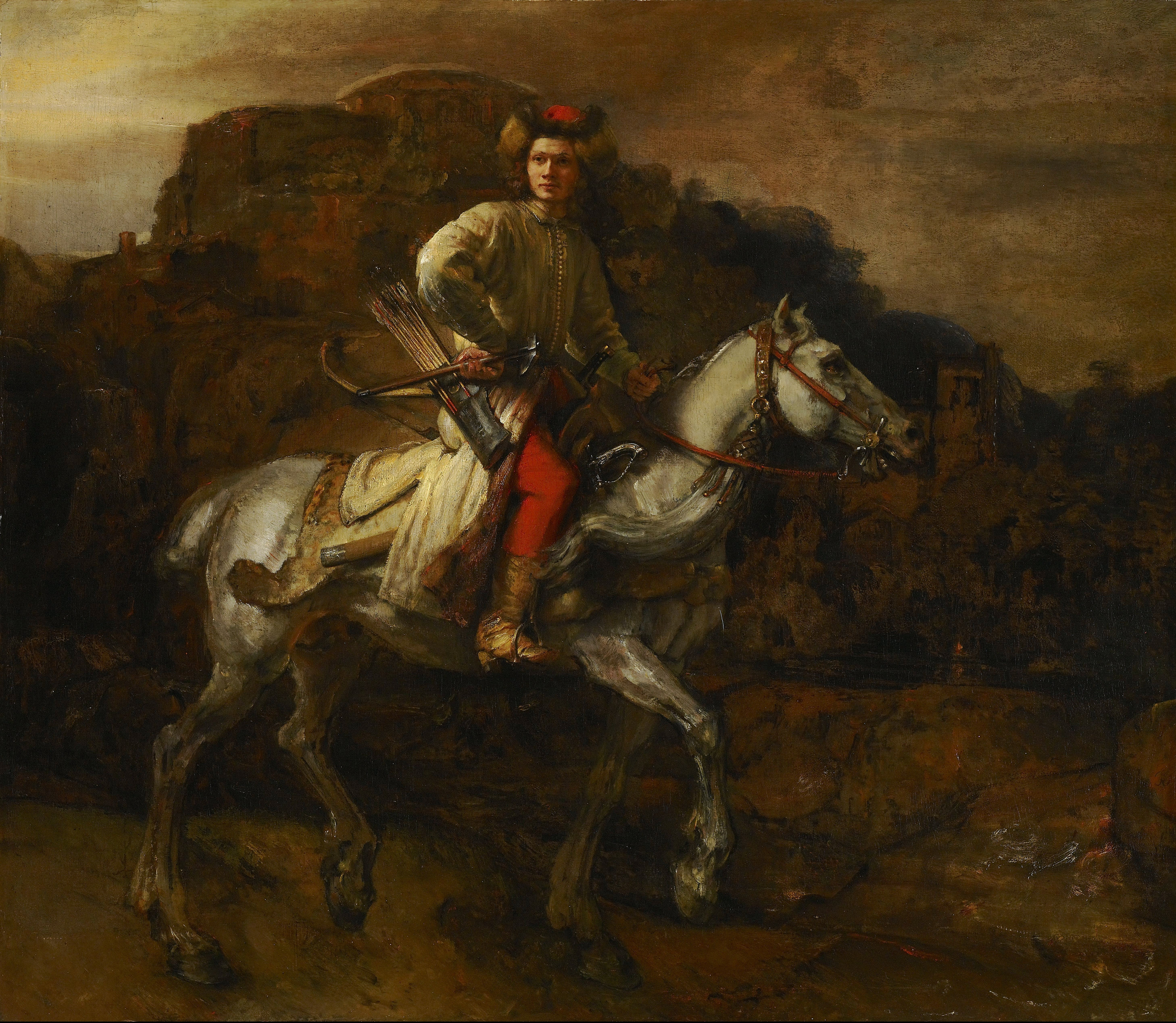
Rembrandt, The Polish Rider, 1655

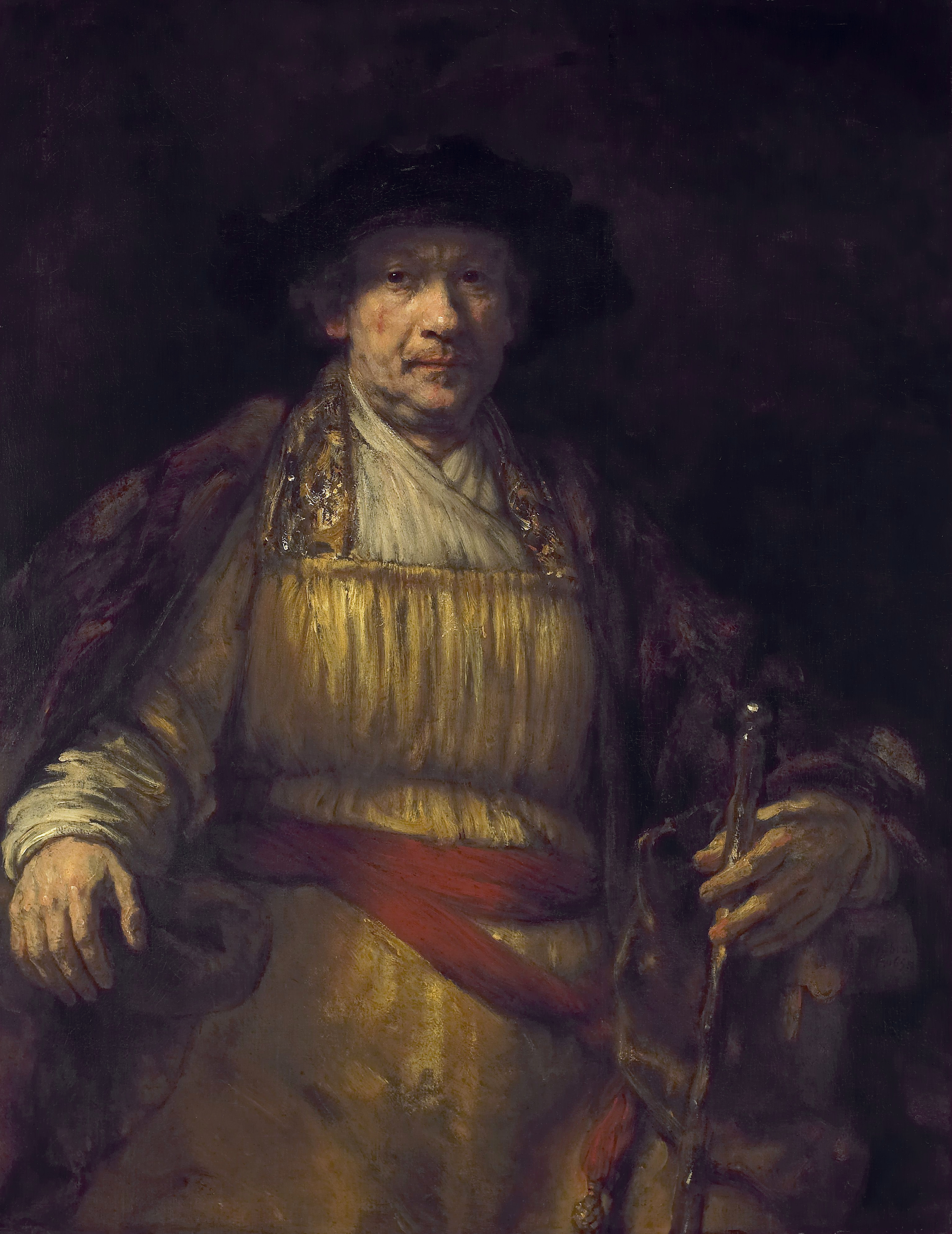
Rembrandt, Self-Portrait, 1658

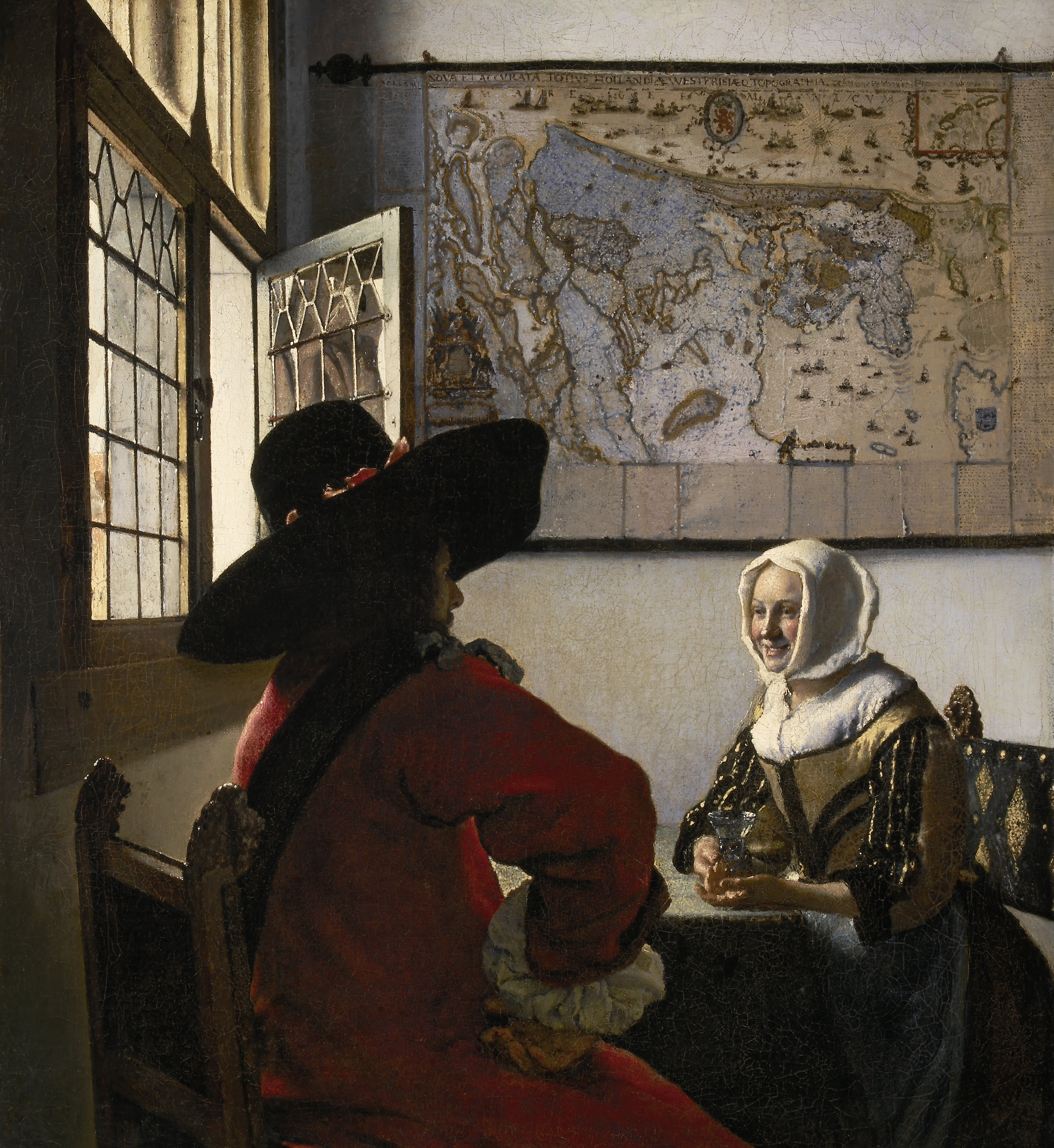
Johannes Vermeer, Officer and Laughing Girl, 1657

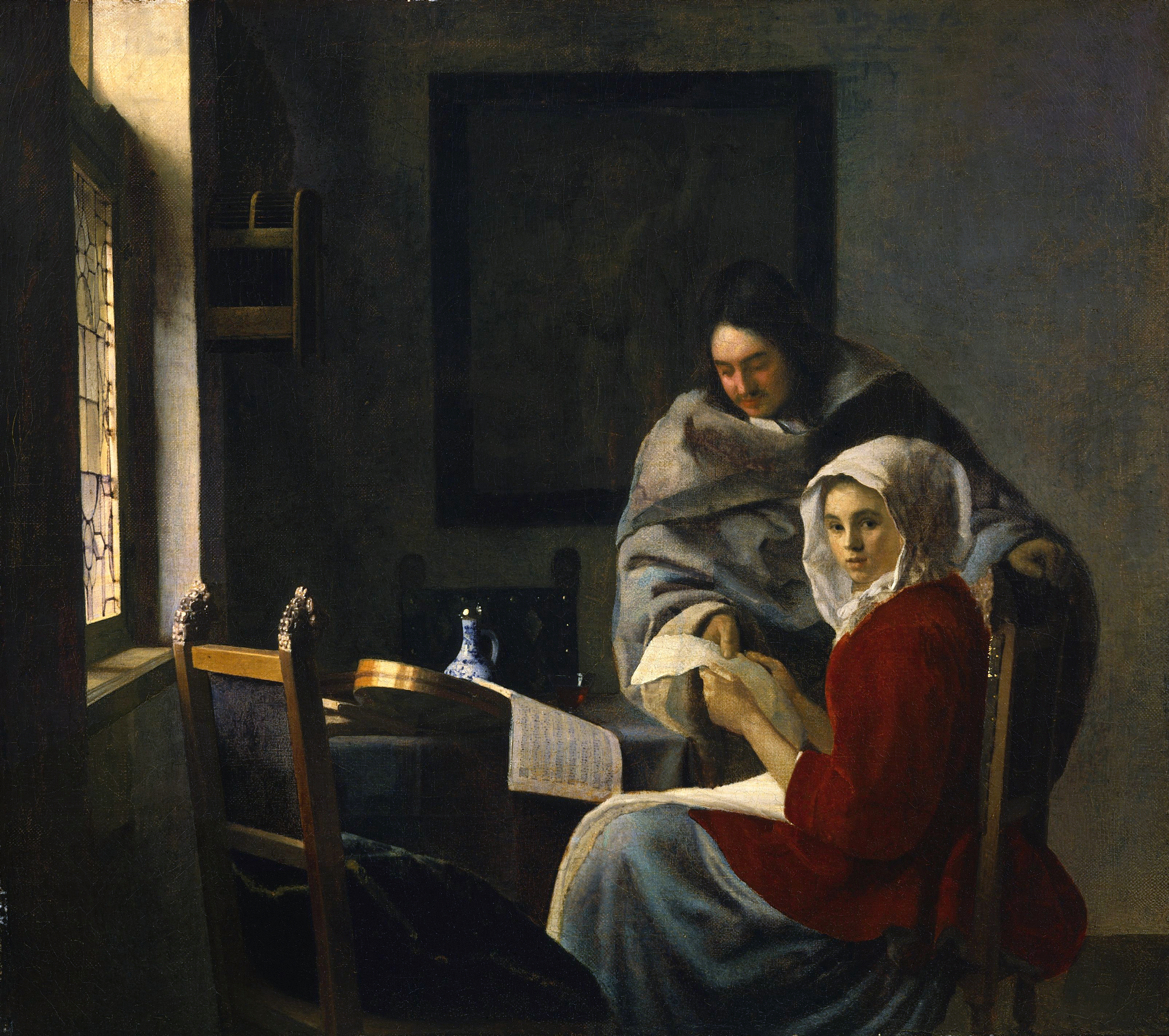
Johannes Vermeer, Girl Interrupted at Her Music, 1658–1661

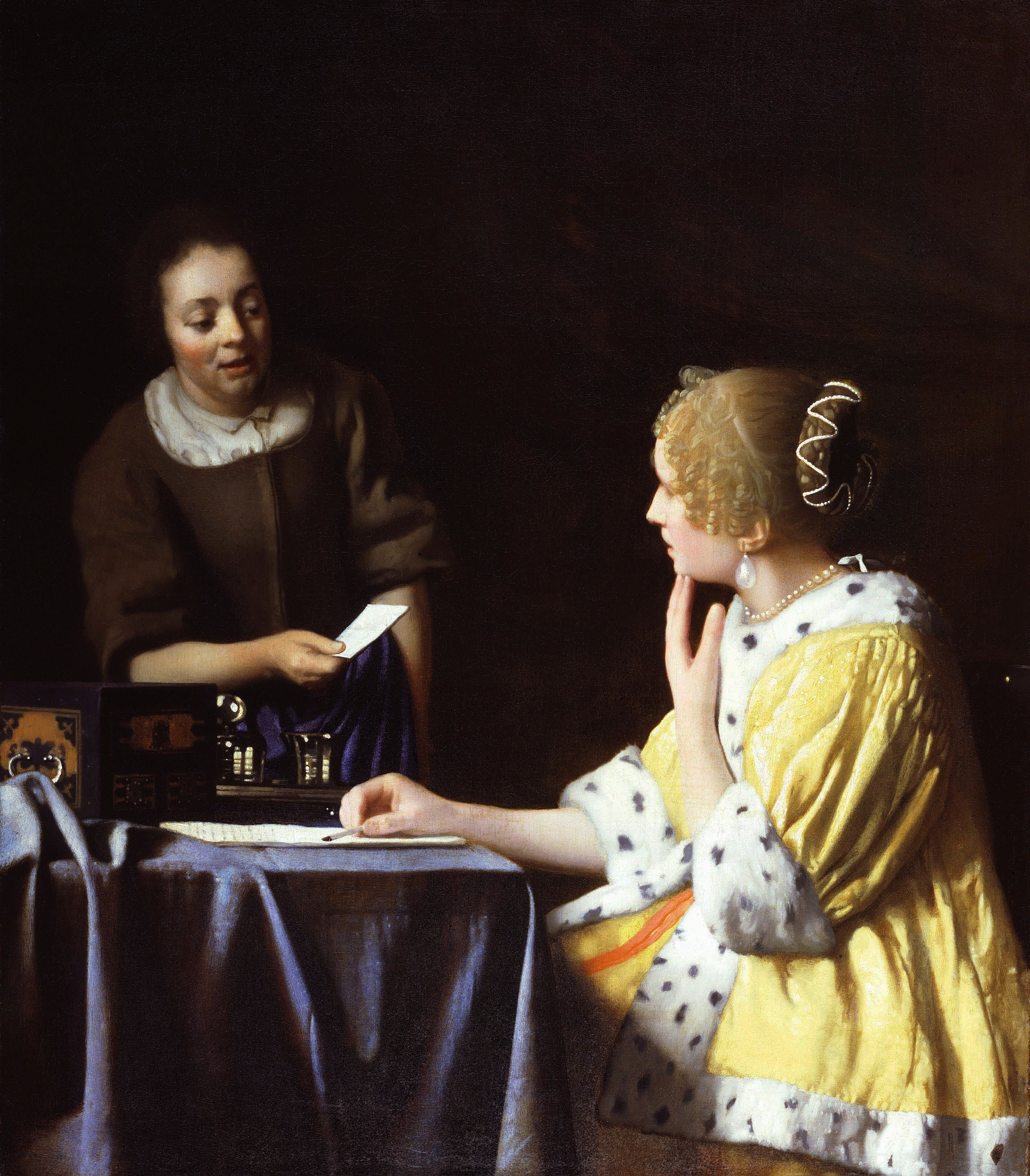
Johannes Vermeer, Mistress and Maid, 1667

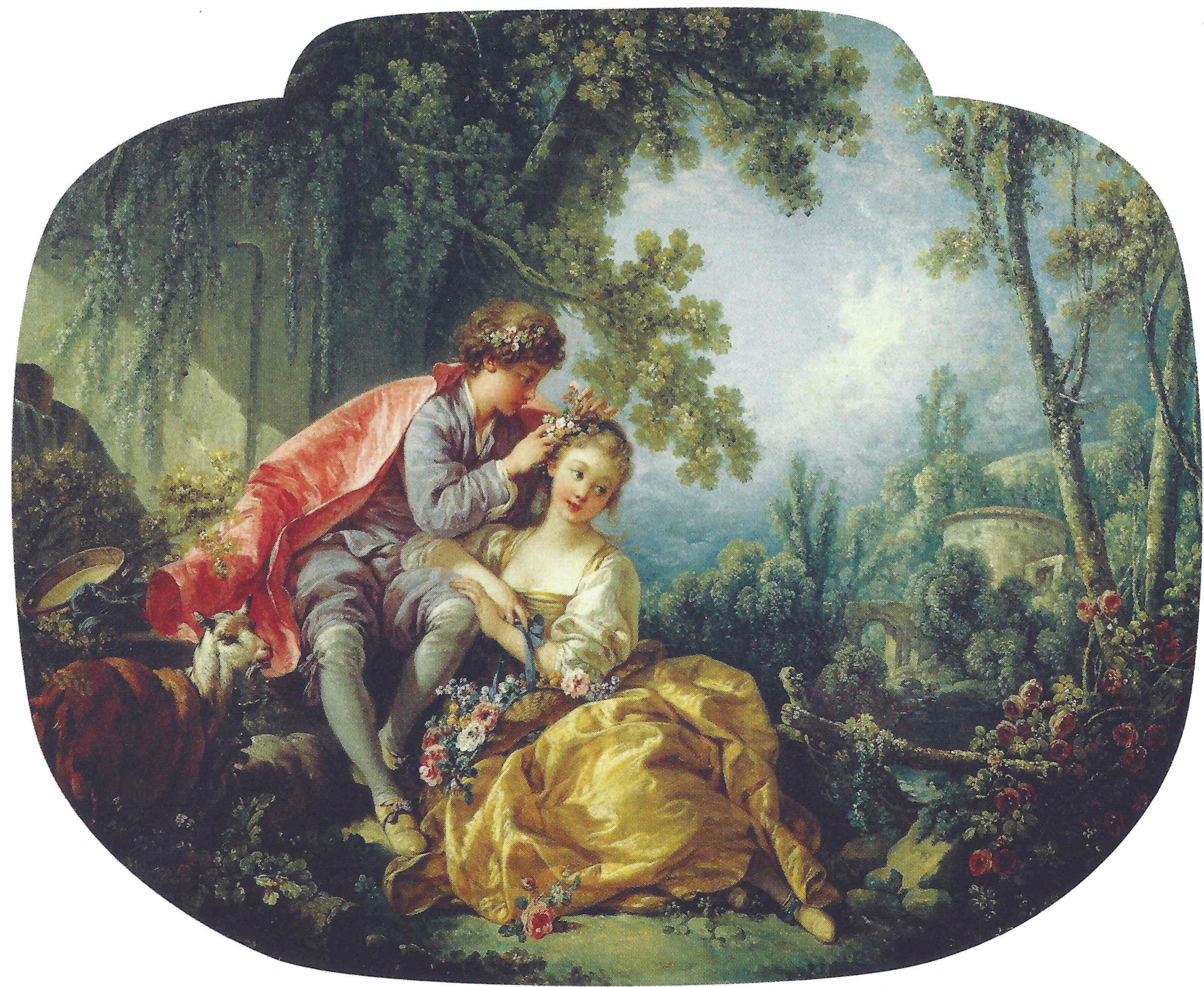
François Boucher, The Four Seasons (Spring), 1755

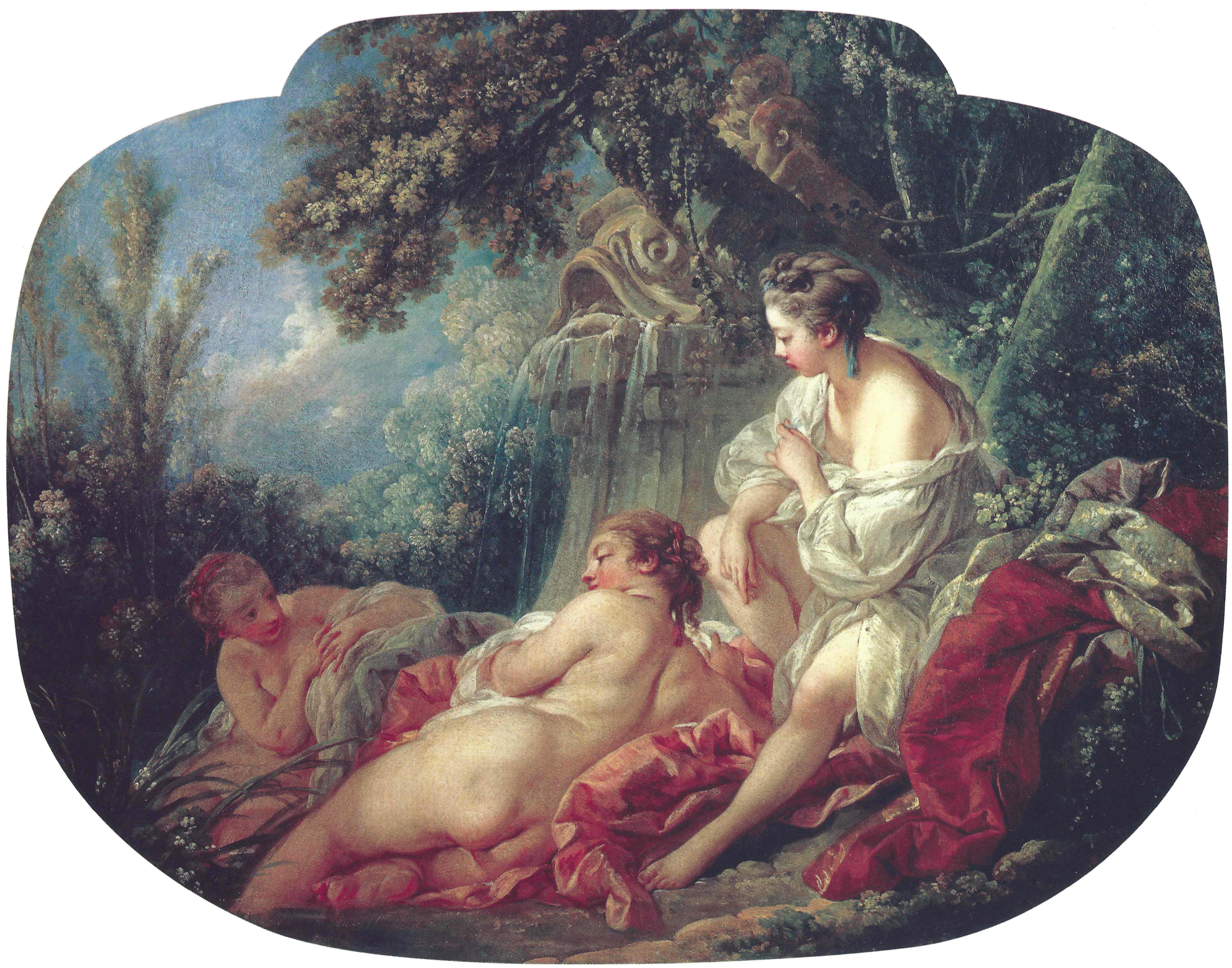
François Boucher, The Four Seasons (Summer), 1755

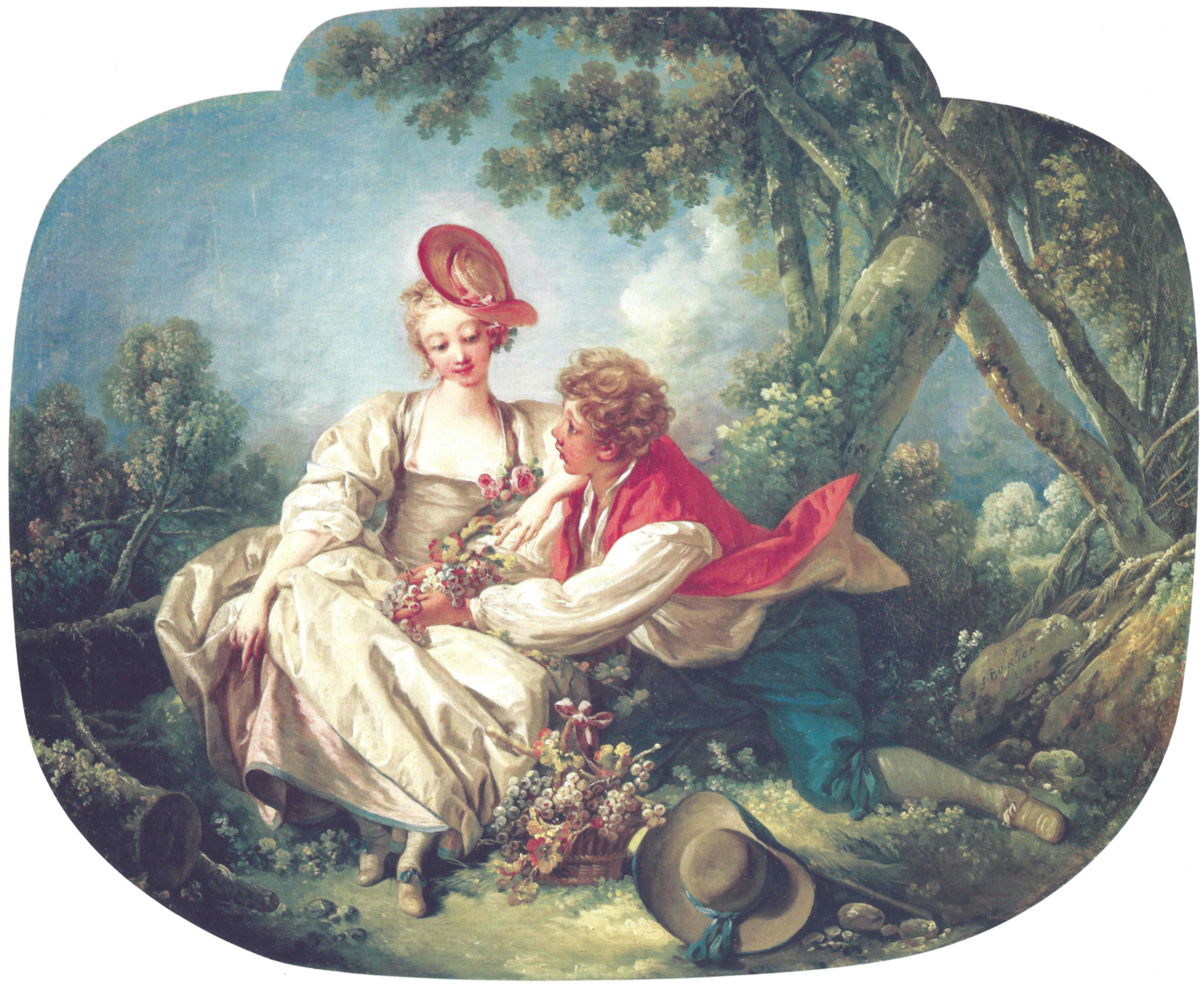
François Boucher, The Four Seasons (Autumn), 1755

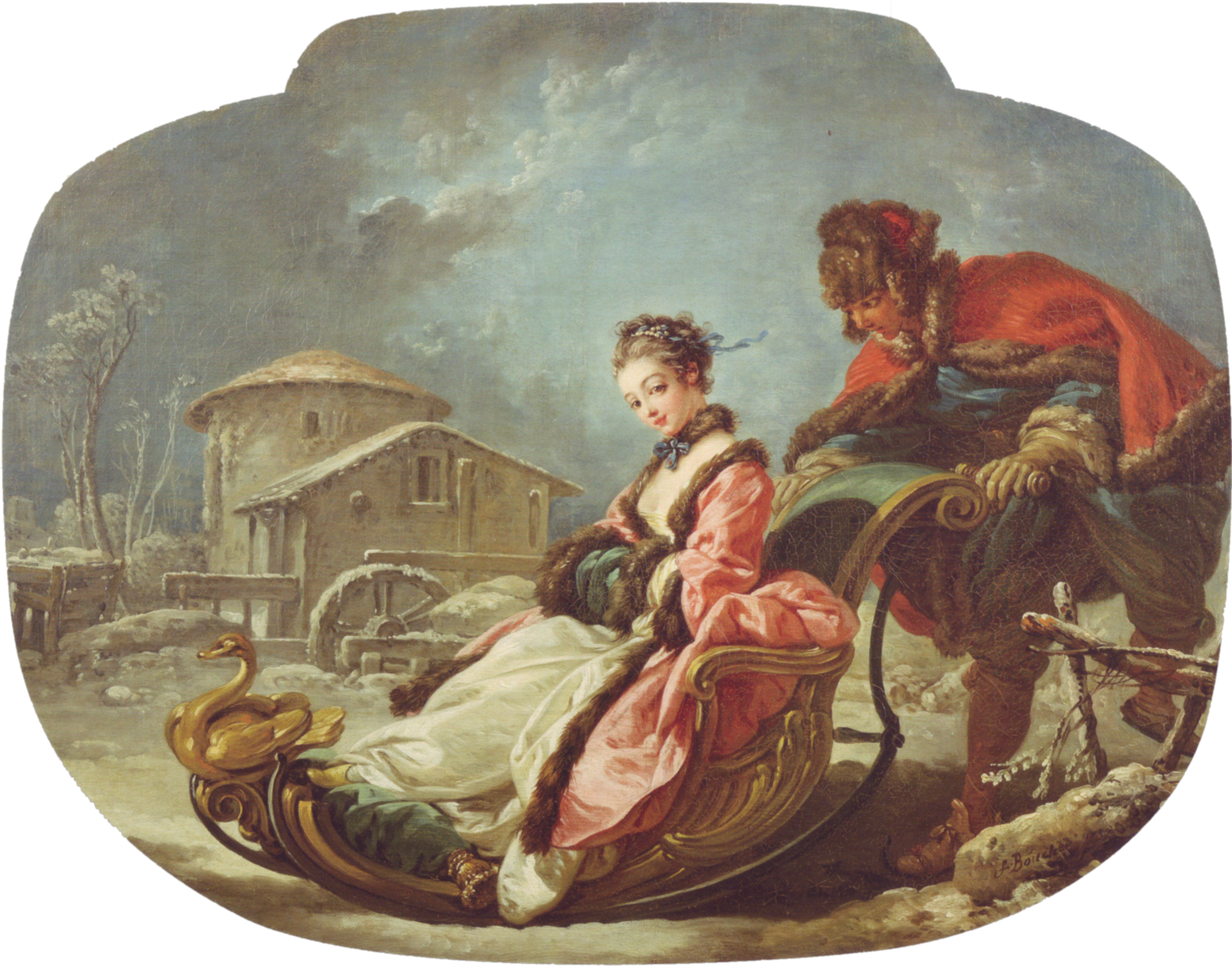
François Boucher, The Four Seasons (Winter), 1755

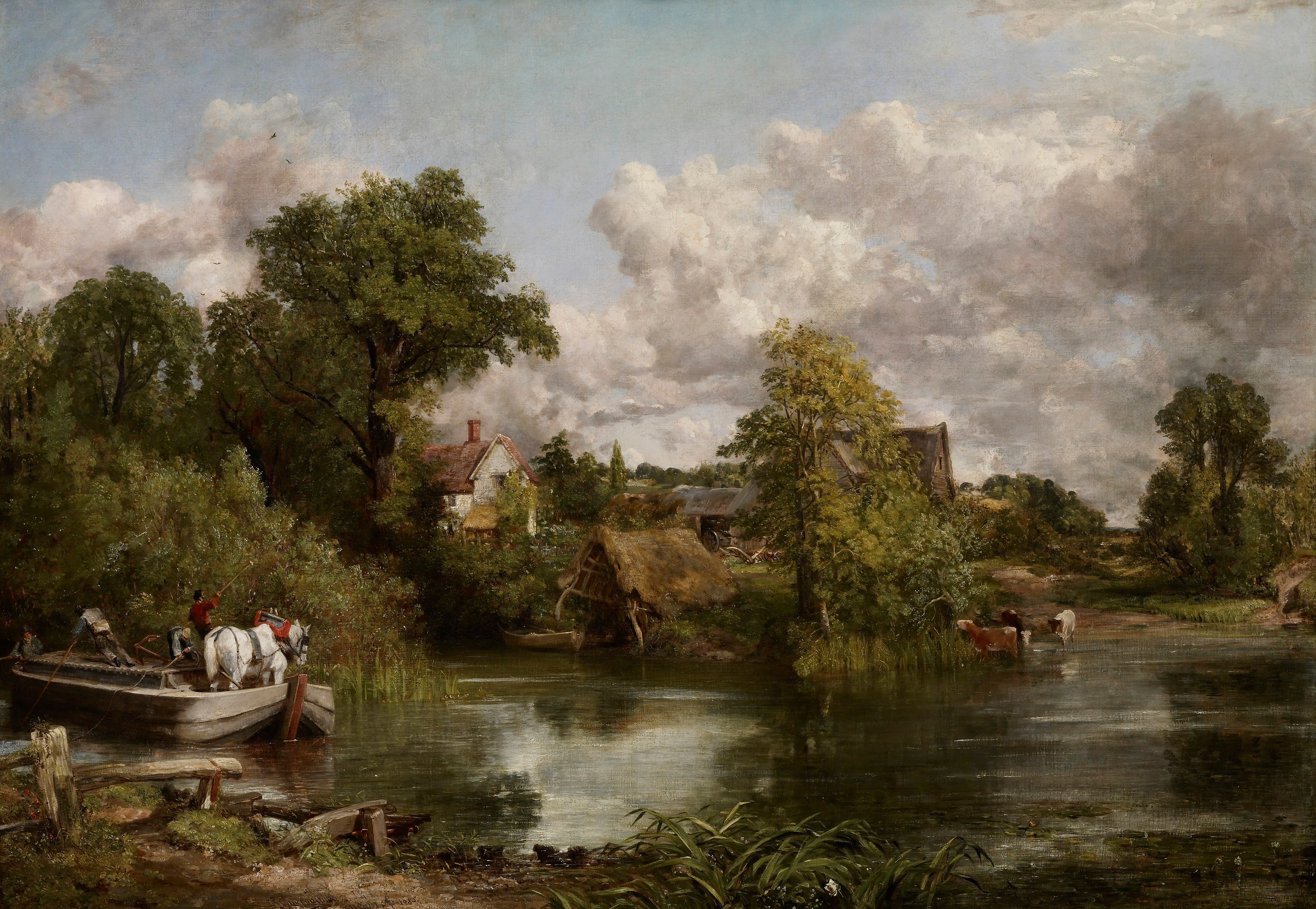
John Constable, The White Horse, 1819

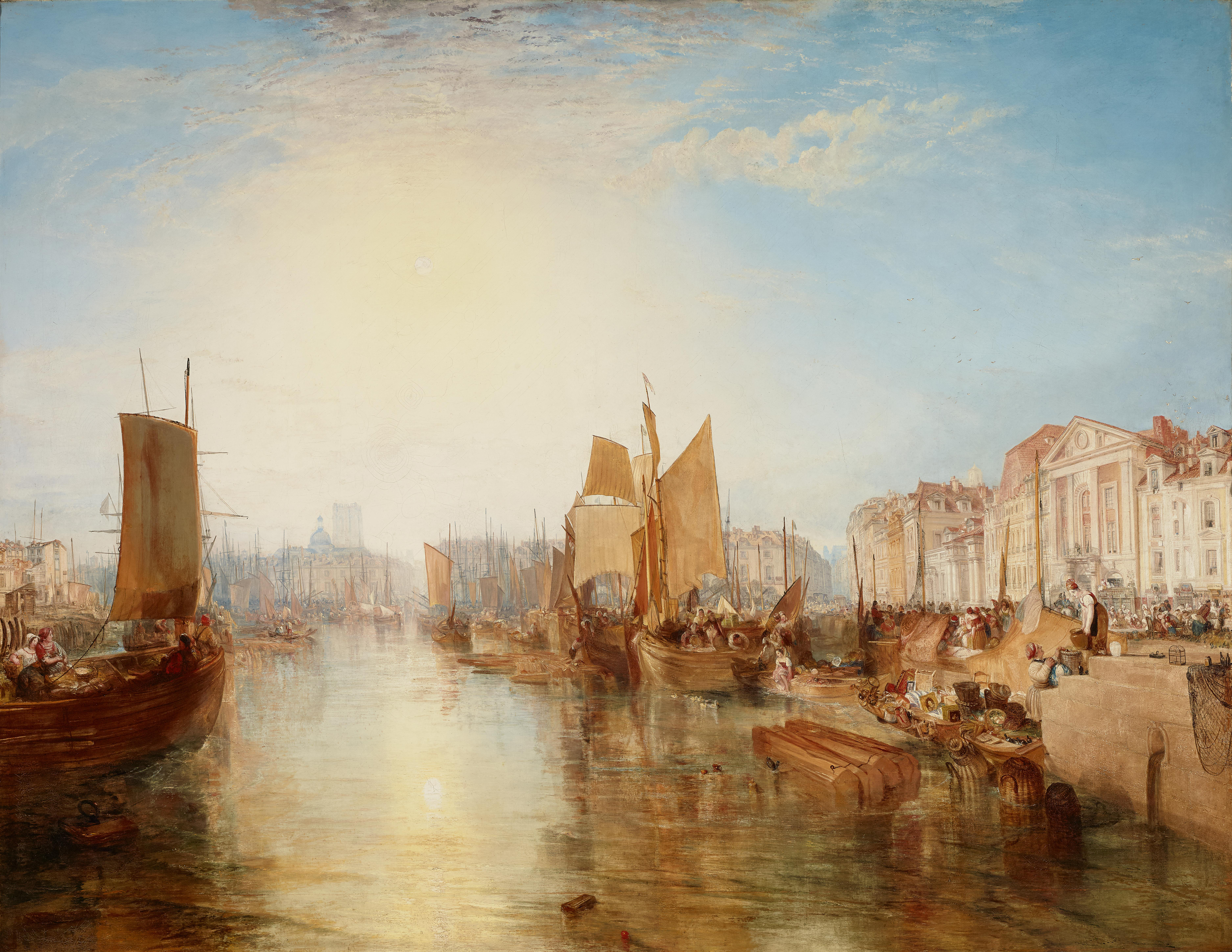
J. M. W. Turner, The Harbour of Dieppe, 1826

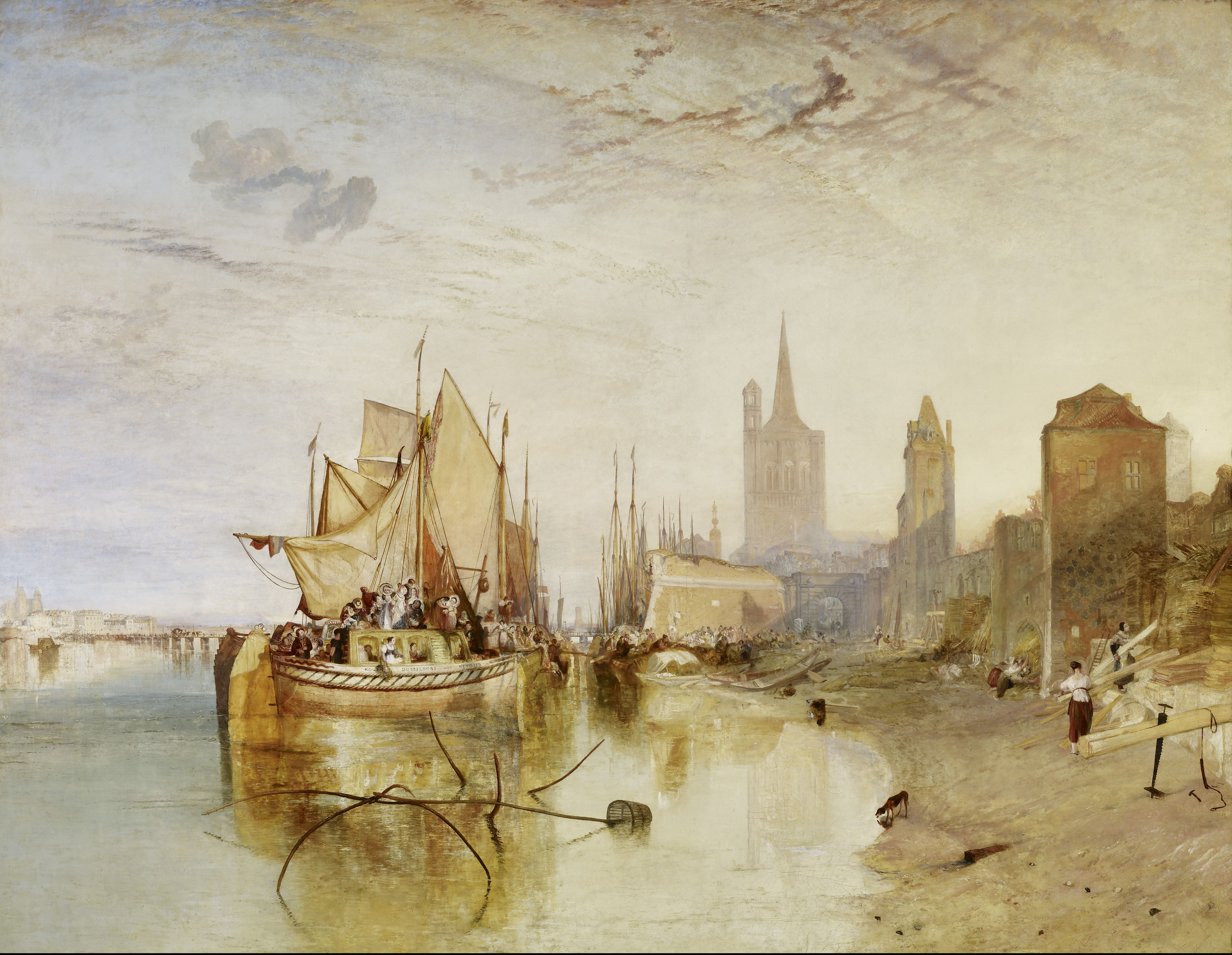
J. M. W. Turner, Cologne, the Arrival of a Packet Boat in the Evening, 1826

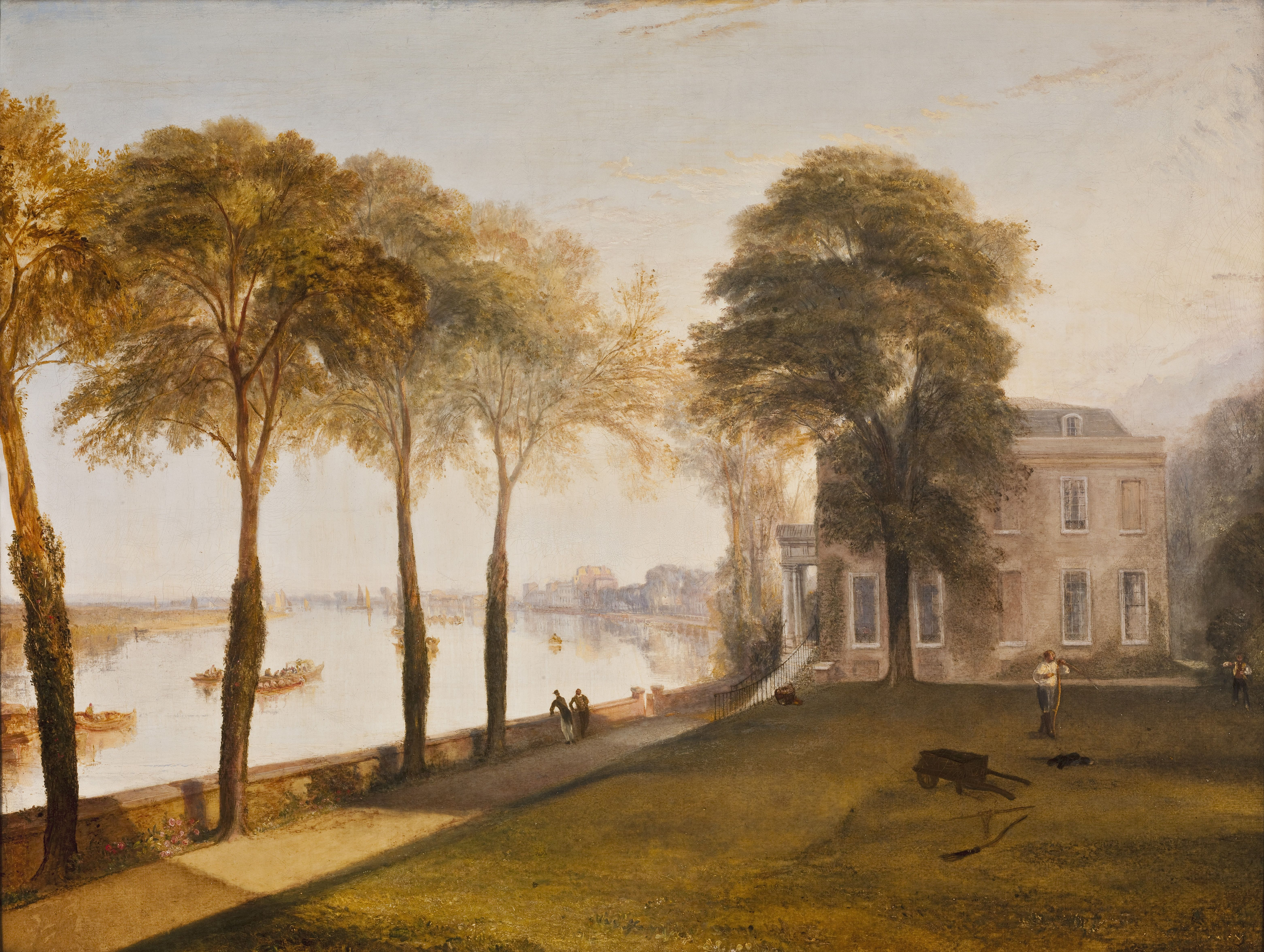
J. M. W. Turner, Mortlake Terrace: Early Summer Morning, 1826
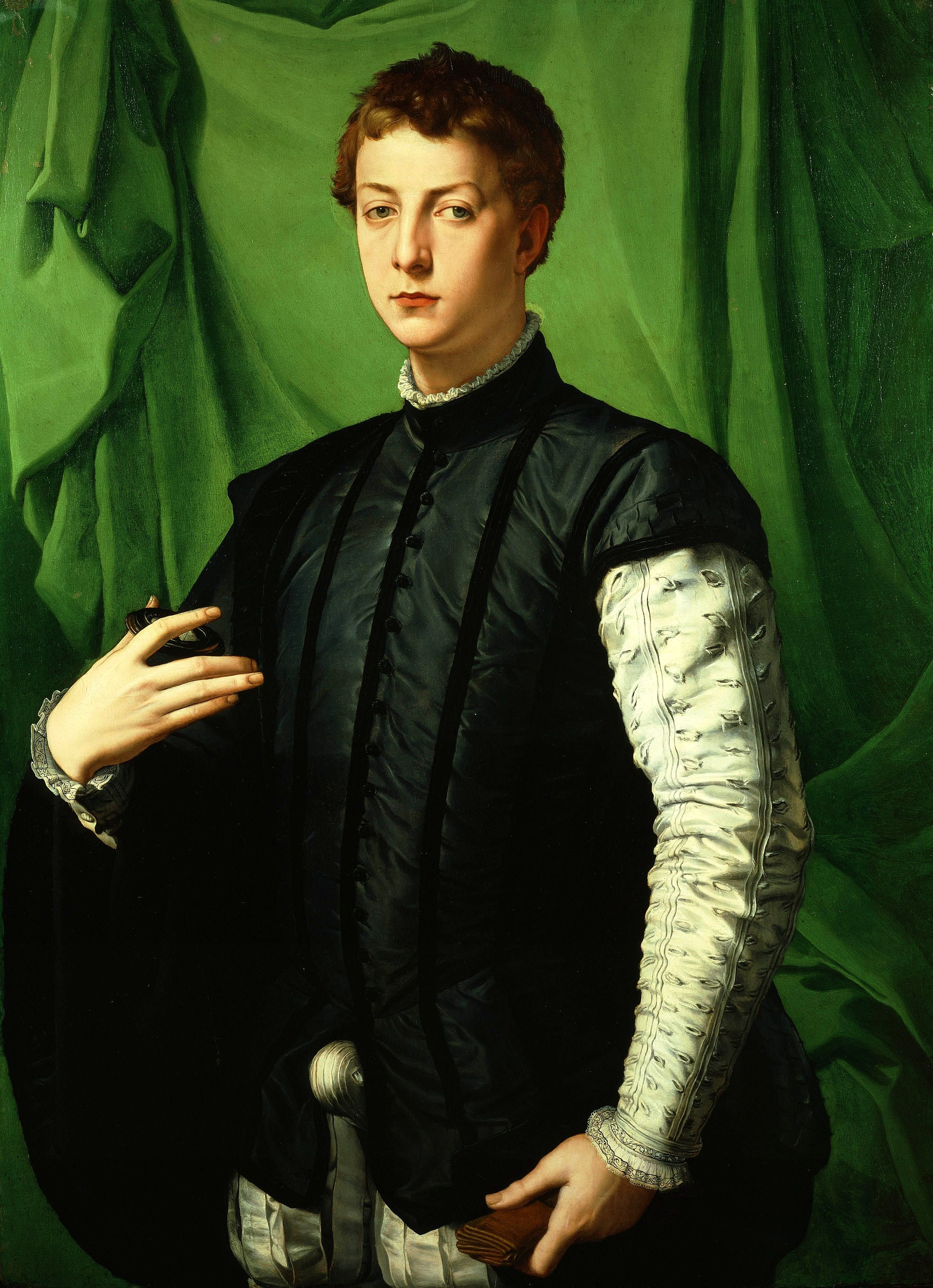
Agnolo di Cosimo (Bronzino), Portrait of Ludovico Capponi, 1551

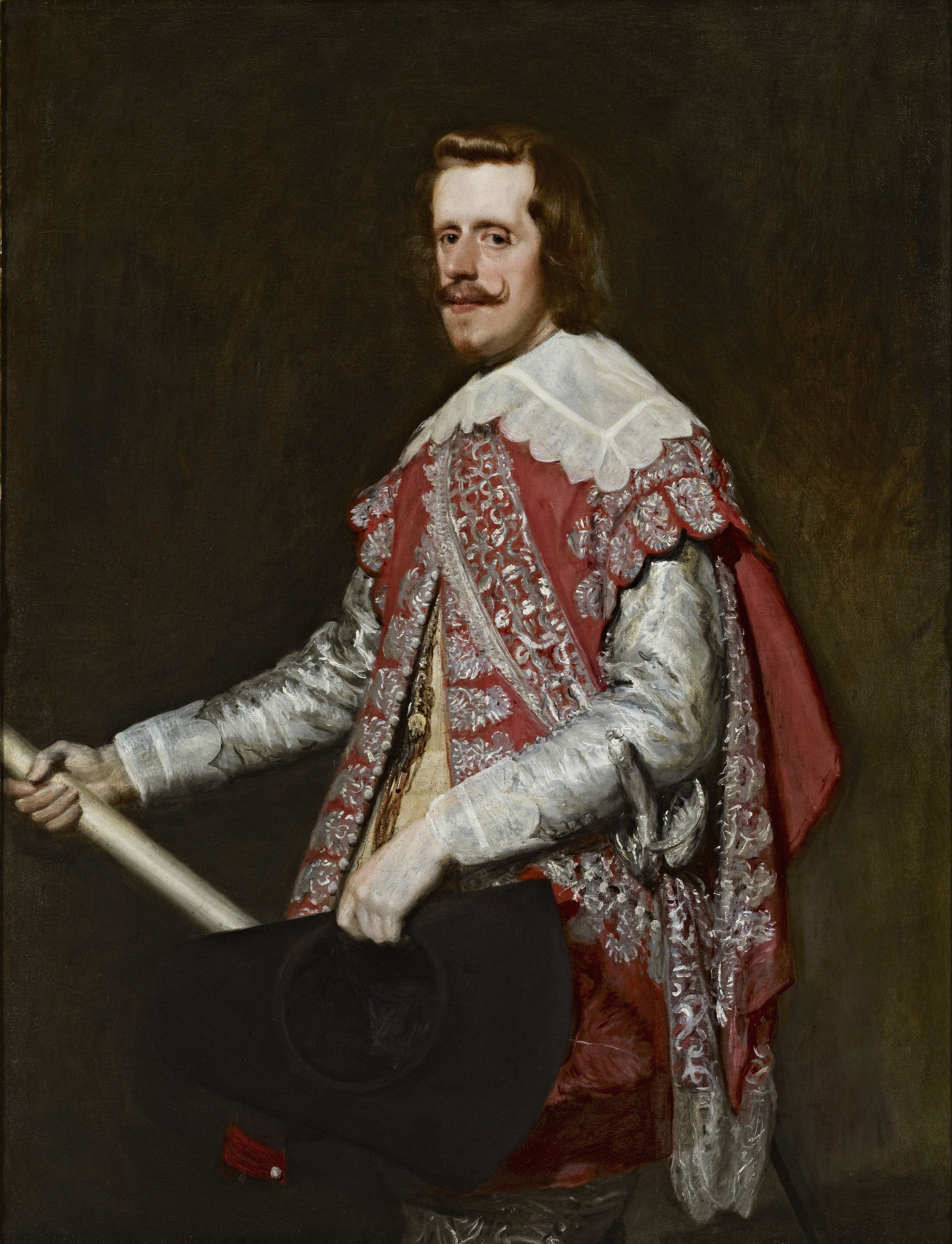
Diego Velázquez, King Philip IV of Spain, 1644

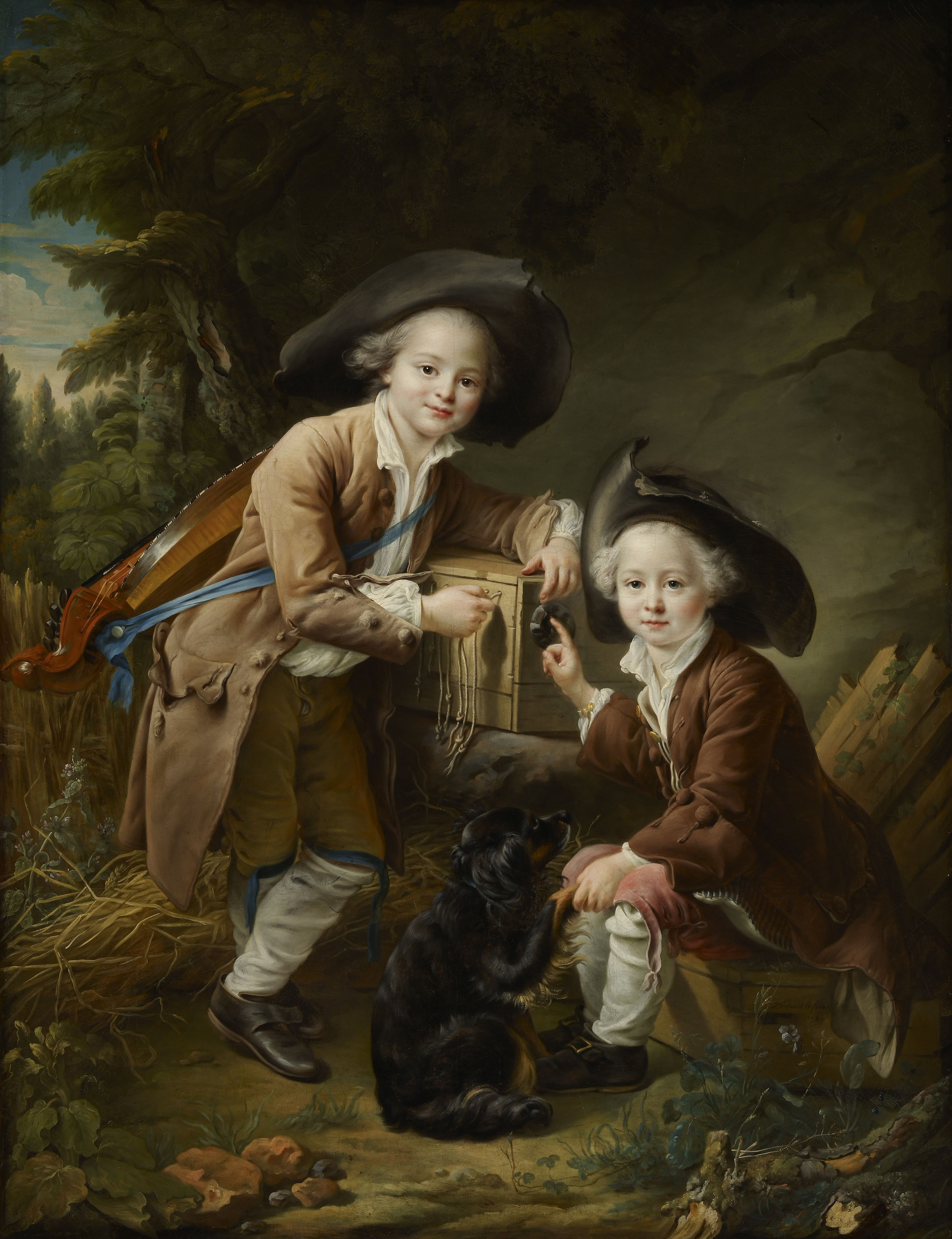
François-Hubert Drouais, The Comte and Chevalier de Choiseul as Savoyards, 1758

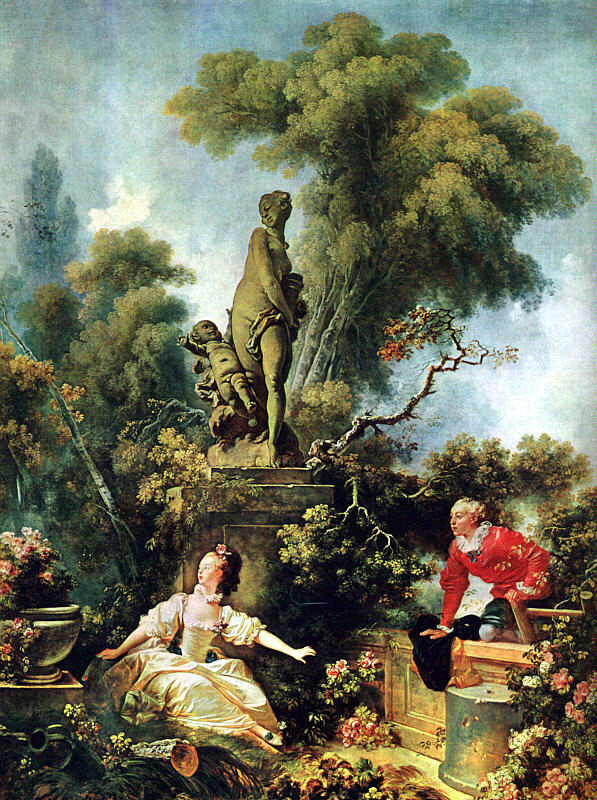
Jean-Honoré Fragonard, The Secret Meeting, 1771

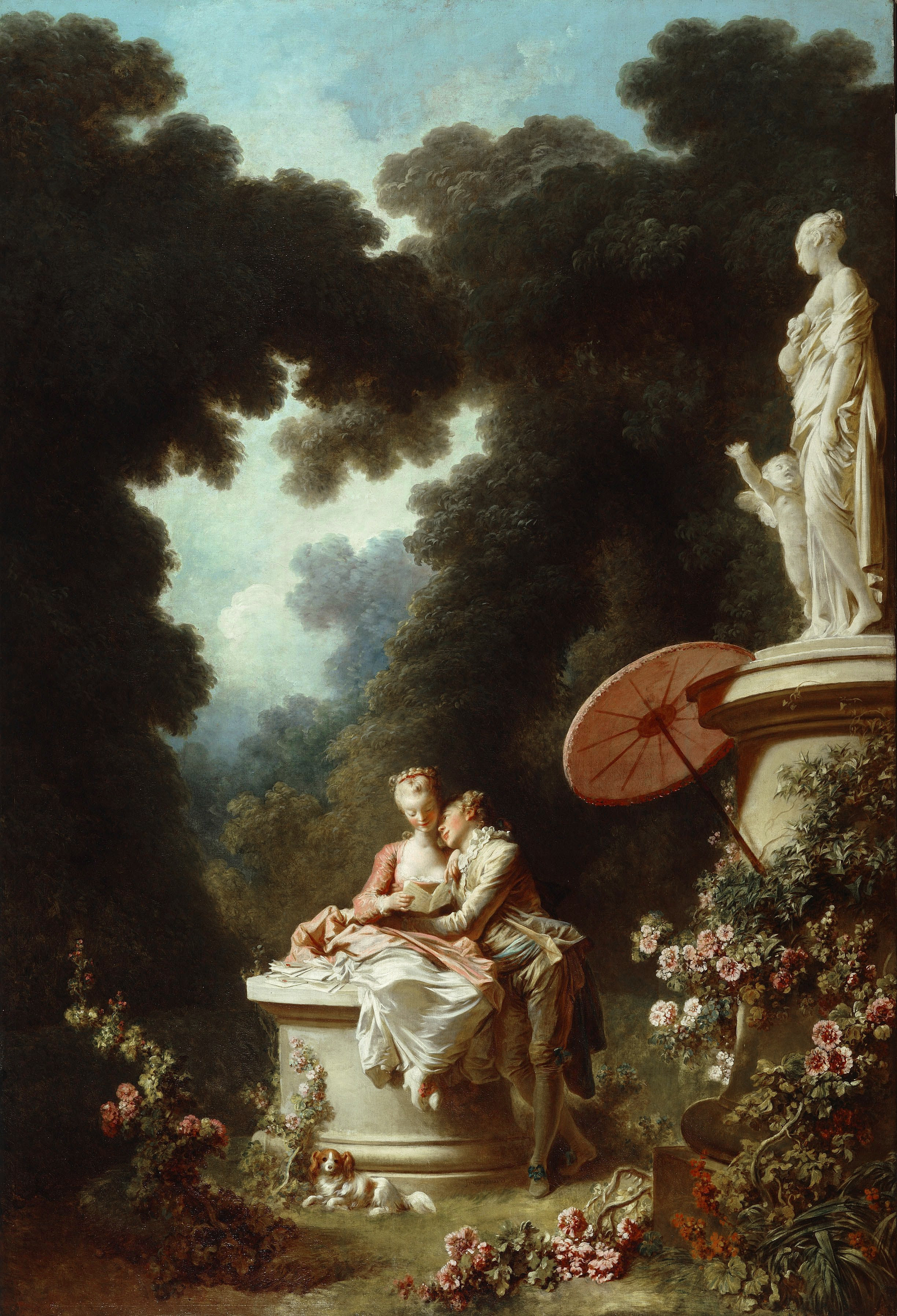
Jean-Honoré Fragonard, The Progress of Love – Love Letters, 1771–1772

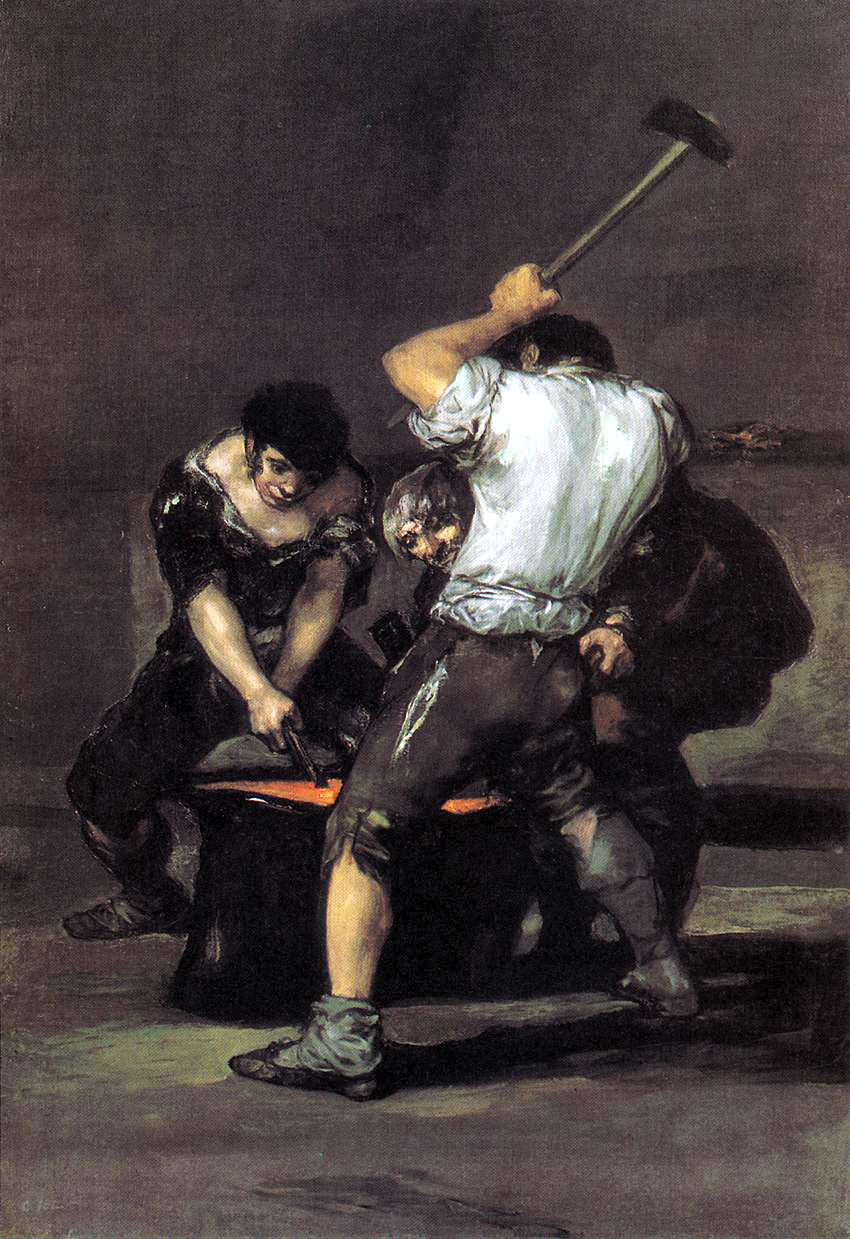
Francisco Goya, The Forge, 1817

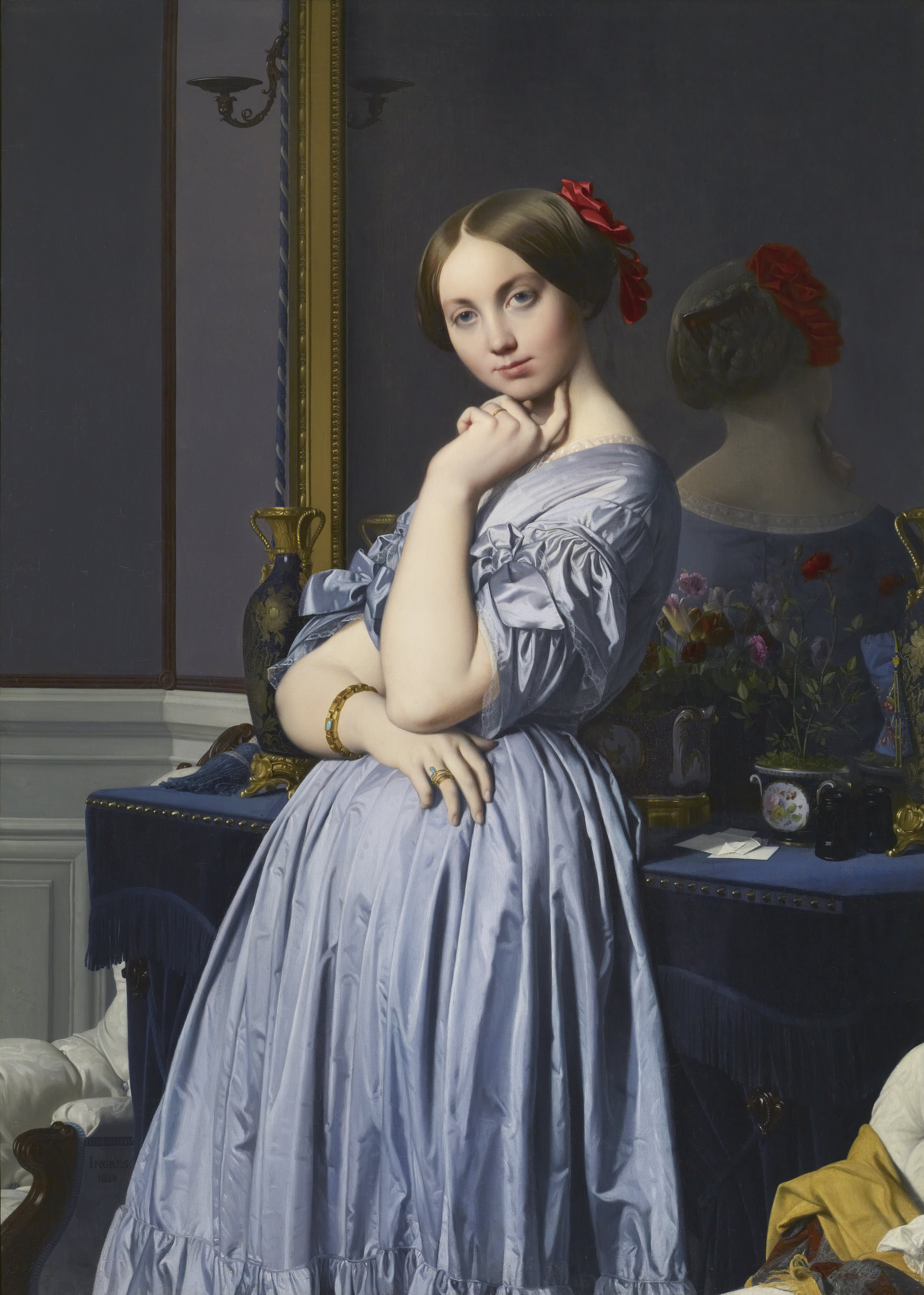
Jean Auguste Dominique Ingres, Portrait of Comtesse d'Haussonville, 1845

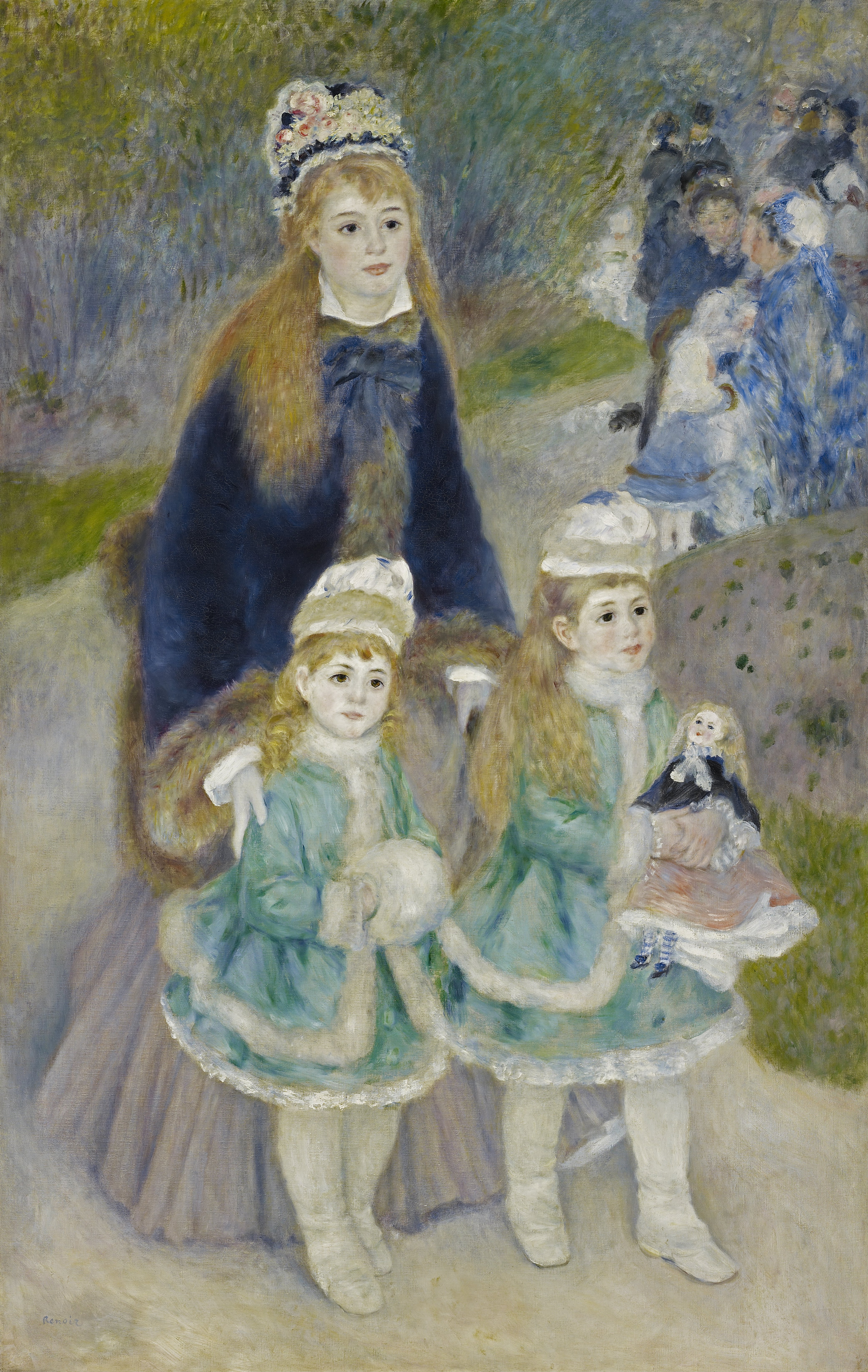
Pierre-Auguste Renoir, Mother and Children (La Promenade), 1875–76

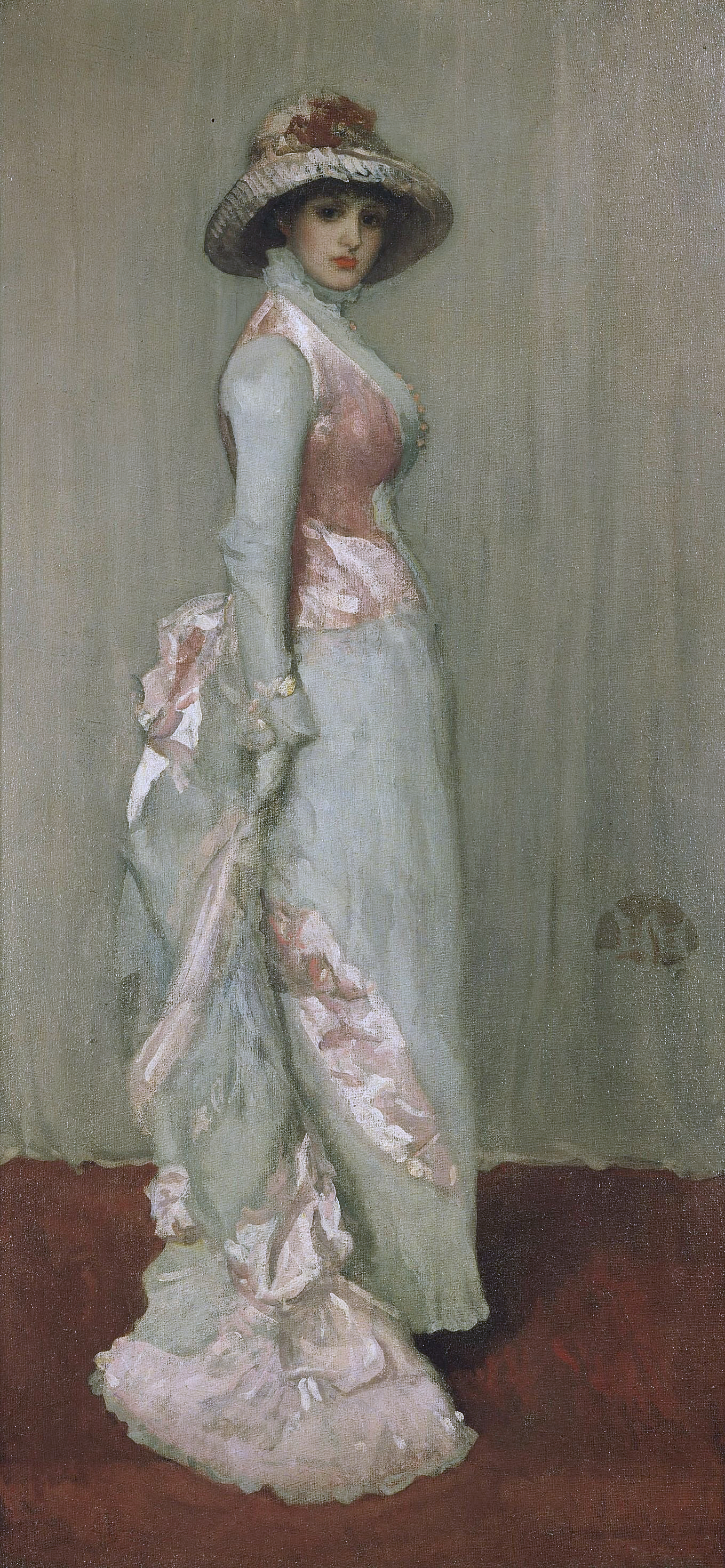
James McNeill Whistler, Harmony in Pink and Grey (Portrait of Lady Meux), 1881

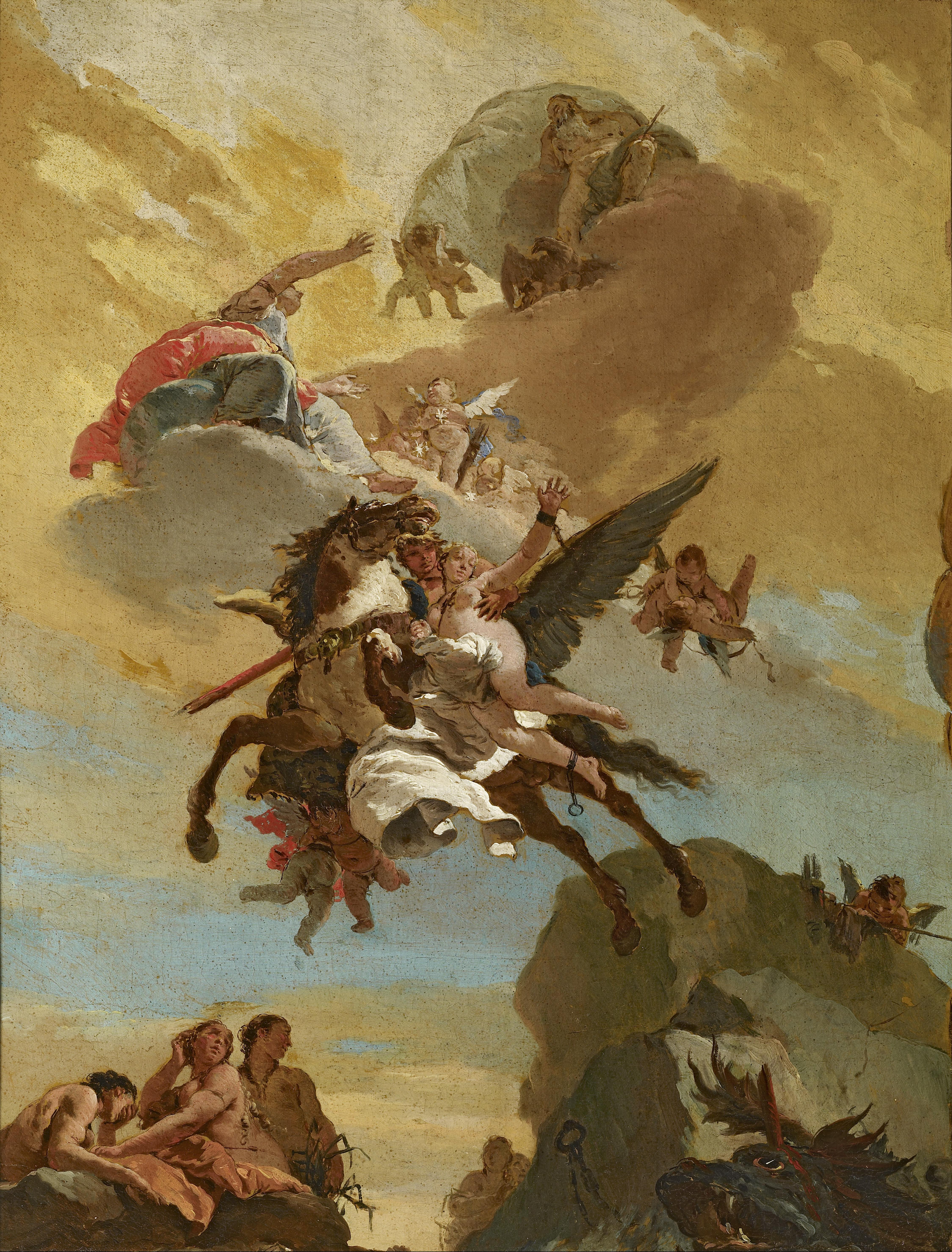
Giovanni Battista Tiepolo, Perseus and Andromeda, 1730–31

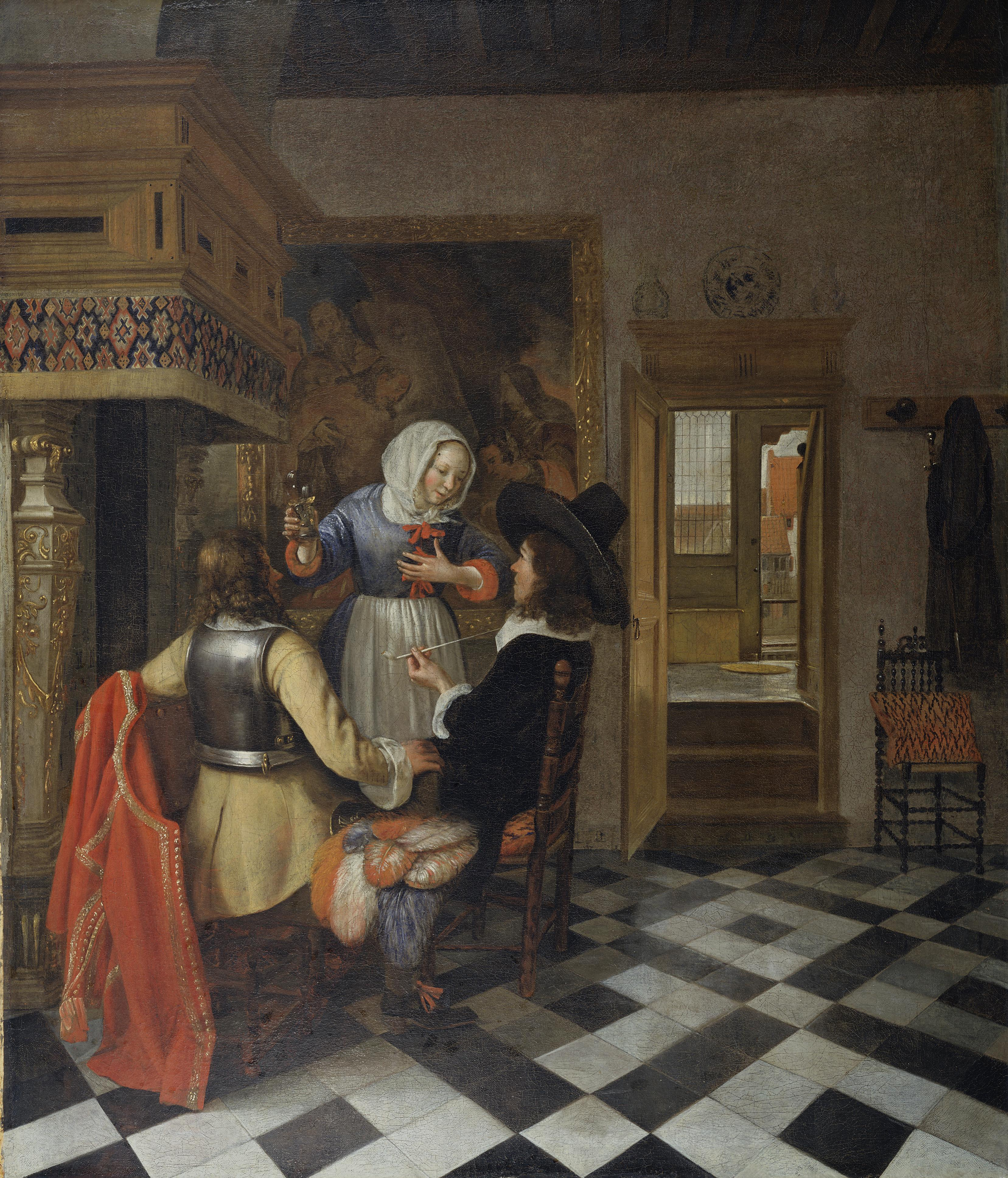
Hendrick van der Burgh, Drinkers before the Fireplace, 1660

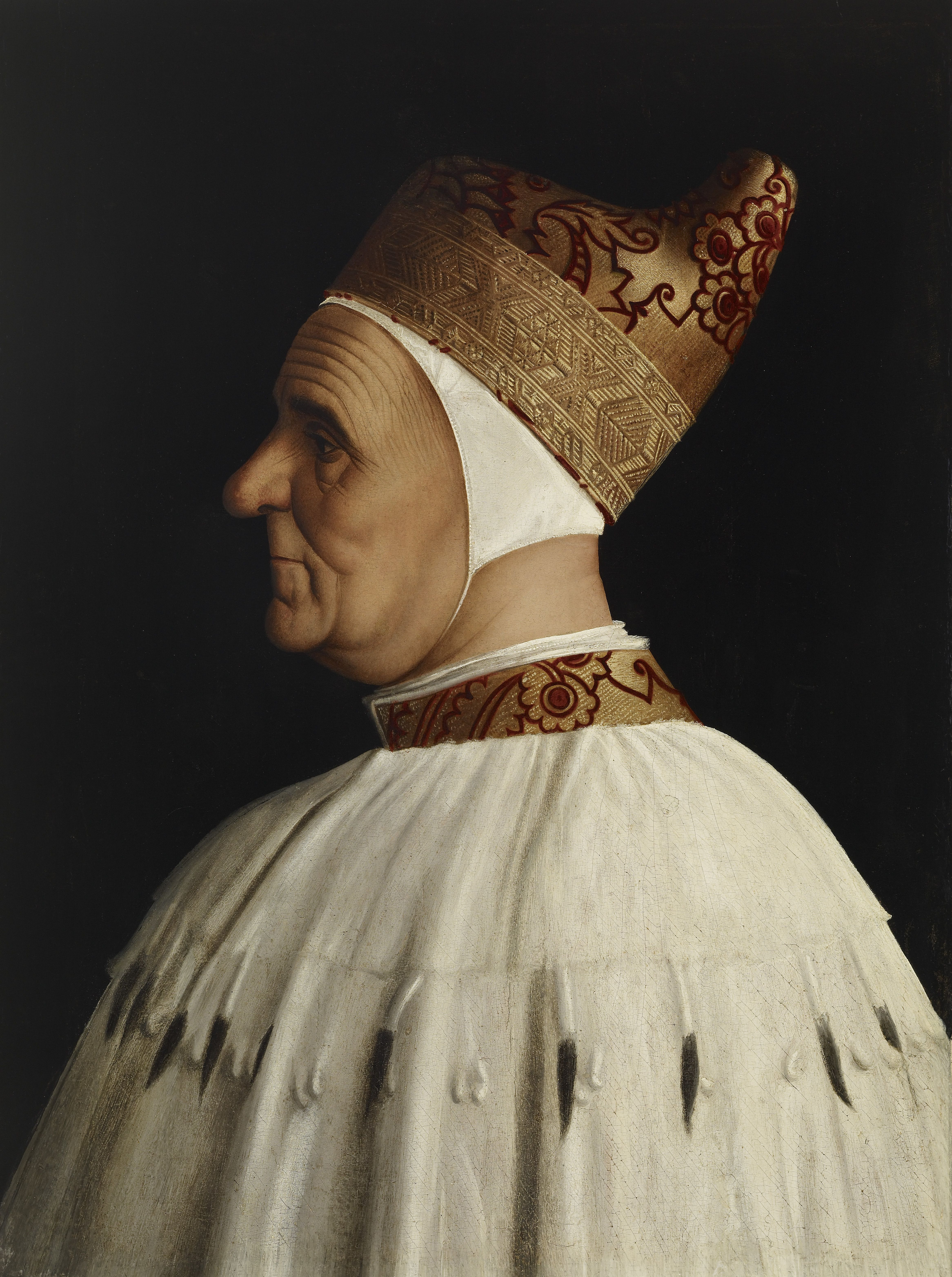
Gentile Bellini, Doge Giovanni Mocenigo, 1478–1485

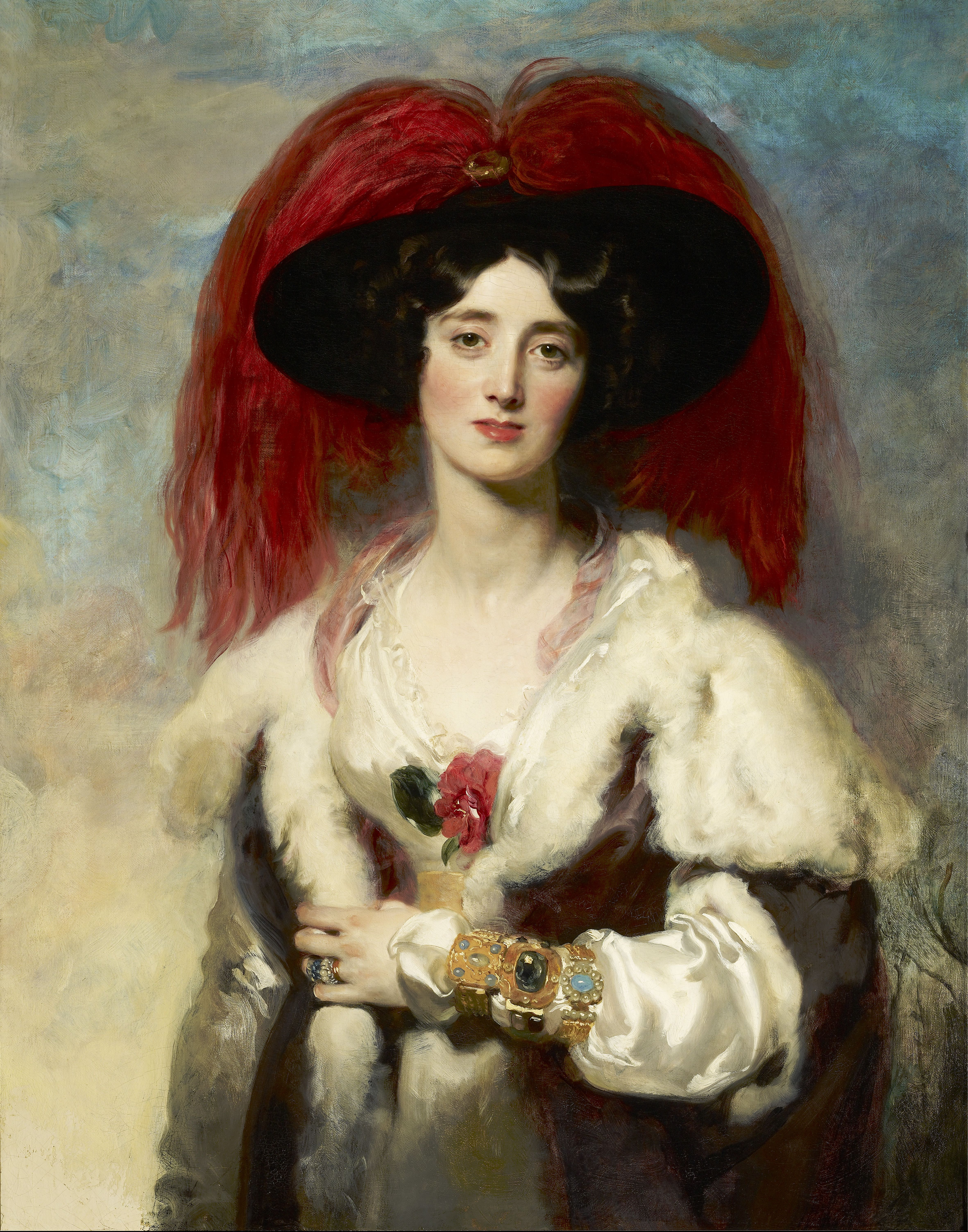
Thomas Lawrence, Portrait of Julia, Lady Peel, 1827

== Programming and events ==
=== Temporary exhibits ===
The Frick Collection has historically hosted temporary exhibitions less frequently than similar museums. It initially focused almost exclusively on its permanent collection, with one temporary exhibit a year during the 1960s. Since 1972, the Frick has sometimes hosted small exhibitions on narrowly defined topics; in some cases, exhibitions have consisted of a single painting. By the 2010s, the museum hosted five exhibits a year on average, and exhibitions were scheduled several years in advance.

==== Late 20th century ====
Temporary exhibitions in the 1970s included an exhibit in honor of the museum's late director Harry D. M. Grier, bronzes by Severo Calzetta da Ravenna, and drawings by Fragonard. Topics of temporary exhibitions during the 1980s included busts by Houdon, French clocks, terracotta sculptures by Clodion, drawings by Ingres, Henry Clay Frick's earliest acquisitions, and Old Master paintings.

Especially in the late 20th and early 21st centuries, the museum has hosted temporary exhibitions about singular artworks or artists. Among the items exhibited in the 1990s were works by French painter Nicolas Lancret, watercolors from the Rijksmuseum, eighteenth- and nineteenth-century drawings from the Stanford Museum, a single Claude Monet painting, drawings by German artists, and drawings by French artists. In 1999, several items in the permanent collection were taken out of storage specifically to complement an exhibition of Ingres's Portrait of Comtesse d'Haussonville.

==== 21st century ====
In the early 2000s, the topics of the Frick's exhibitions included drawings in the collection of the Albertina museum, paintings from John Hay Whitney's collection, El Greco paintings, antique clocks, pieces from the Toledo Museum of Art's collection, a set of Parmigianino paintings, and three consecutive exhibits of antique bronzes. Later in the decade, the temporary exhibitions included portraits by Hans Memling, paintings by Paolo Veronese, a show of French art, the Frick's first Meissen porcelain show, pieces from the Norton Simon Museum's collection, and a single painting by Parmigianino. The Frick hosted various exhibits in honor of its 75th anniversary in 2010, including an exhibition on its own founding. Other early-2010s exhibits included works from the Dulwich Picture Gallery, works from the Courtauld Gallery, Picasso drawings, Renoir paintings, Piero della Francesca panels, and a historical overview of St. Francis in the Desert.

After some works from the Mauritshuis in The Hague were displayed at the Frick in 2013, the Frick displayed several paintings at the Mauritshuis in 2015, marking the first time that the Frick lent paintings to a European museum. During the mid- and late 2010s, the subjects of the Frick's exhibits included paintings from the Scottish National Gallery's collection, paintings from the Museo dell'Opera del Duomo in Florence, works by Andrea del Sarto, objects by Pierre Gouthière, and canvases by J. M. W. Turner. When the Frick moved to 945 Madison Avenue in the early 2020s, its exhibits included a showcase of Barkley Hendricks paintings (the museum's first exhibit of a black artist's art) and a pair of paintings by Giovanni Bellini and Giorgio da Castelfranco.

=== Other programs ===
The museum hosts special events, such as academic symposiums, concerts, and classes. The educational programs are led by Rika Burnham, who became head of the museum's education department in 2008. The Frick's educational programs include online visits for students at secondary schools and postsecondary institutions, as well as courses where a single piece is discussed at length. The Frick also has partnerships with local educational partnerships such as the Ghetto Film School. Docents began hosting lectures in galleries in 2010, and the museum launched a mobile app in 2014, allowing visitors to bookmark artworks in the museum's collection. After the Frick closed for renovation, museum officials launched several digital programs, including drawing classes and discussions about artwork.

Every year since 2000, the Frick hosts the Young Fellows Ball, a springtime gala for philanthropists who are largely under age 40. The museum also started hosting an annual Garden Party in 2008; the event, which began as a members-only gathering, evolved into an annual fundraiser. In 2016, the Frick introduced First Fridays, in which patrons could visit the museum for free on the first Friday of every month. First Fridays include gallery talks and activities for visitors.

The Concerts from the Frick Collection series was launched in 1938 and has continued to the present. Musicians who have performed at the Frick Collection have included Ian Bostridge, Matthias Goerne, Guarneri String Quartet, Wanda Landowska, Gregor Piatigorsky, Artur Schnabel, and Kiri Te Kanawa. The concerts were broadcast on radio starting in 1939, first on the Municipal Broadcasting System, then on American Public Radio and WNYC. Although visitors originally could listen to the concerts free of charge (even after the museum started charging an admission fee), a separate admission charge for concerts was instituted in 2005. Prior to the 2020s renovation, the concerts were hosted in the Frick House's music room.

=== Publications ===
The collection is detailed in books such as Masterpieces of the Frick Collection, first published in 1970, and Art in the Frick Collection, first published in 1996. The history of the collection was also detailed in Henry Clay Frick: An Intimate Portrait, a biography of Frick written by his great-granddaughter Martha Frick Symington Sanger in 1998. Sanger's subsequent book The Henry Clay Frick House: Architecture-Interiors—Landscapes in the Golden Era, published in 2001, described the Frick House and its collection in detail. In 2011, the Frick and the BNP Paribas Foundation published a guidebook on the collection, its history, and the Frick House. The Frick launched its Diptych series in 2017; the series consists of short books with essays that relate to paintings from the museum's collection.

== Building ==
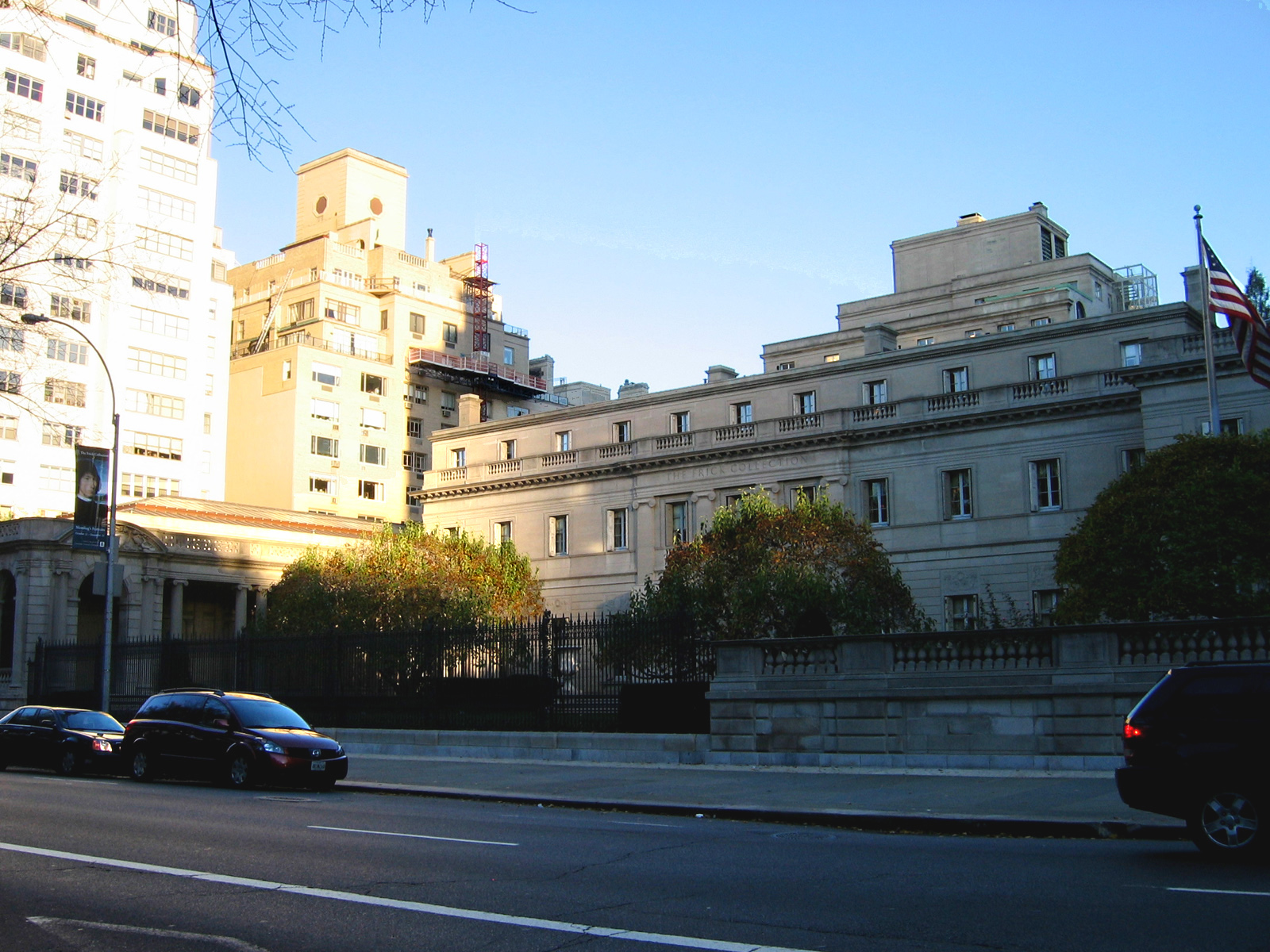
The Frick House, which contains the museum's collection

The museum is located at the Henry Clay Frick House at 1 East 70th Street, which is part of Fifth Avenue's Museum Mile. The house spans an entire blockfront on Fifth Avenue between 70th and 71st Streets. The original structure from 1914 was designed by Thomas Hastings in the Beaux-Arts style. The same style is also used for the 1970s reception wing, designed by Harry Van Dyke, John Barrington Bayley, and G. Frederick Poehler. Both structures have a facade of Indiana Limestone. The house has a lawn that is mostly closed to the public.

The interiors were designed by a variety of people. The British decorator Charles Allom furnished most of the rooms on the ground floor, while the majority of the rooms on the second and third floors were decorated by Elsie de Wolfe. Charles Carstairs and Joseph Duveen provided the original decorations for the rooms. Inside the house are the museum's galleries (adapted from the old living spaces of the mansion), as well as a courtyard with reflecting pool, the latter of which is based on a Roman atrium. Some parts of the house have been modified over the years specifically to accommodate the artwork, including a room for the Fragonard panels. In addition to the artwork and artifacts on display, there are bookcases placed throughout the Frick House's rooms, and some rooms have various other pieces of furniture such as a dining table.

== Frick Art Research Library ==
The Frick Collection oversees the Frick Art Research Library, which was established in 1920 and opened to researchers in June 1924. The library is housed at a 13-story building at 10 East 71st Street (next to the original mansion). Prior to the library building's opening, the basement bowling alley was used as storage space for the library's collection. The library has always been open to the public, except during World War II, when it was closed for six months, and during the COVID-19 pandemic and 2020 renovation, when it was shuttered while being moved to the Frick Madison. The library is typically open free of charge to "any adult with a serious interest in art". In the late 20th century, the library served 6,000 people a year on average, most of whom made advance reservations or requests.

Helen Frick acted as director for six decades, during which time its collection expanded to include 50,000 sales catalogs, 400,000 photographs, and 150,000 books. By the 1990s, the library had an estimated 235,000 volumes, which grew to 280,000 by the late 2000s. The collections of the library focus on art of the Western tradition from the fourth century to the mid-twentieth century, and chiefly include information about paintings, drawings, sculpture, prints, and illuminated manuscripts. Archival materials supplement its research collections. The Frick Art Research Library Photoarchive contains over a million photocopies of artwork, including objects that are not in the museum's collection.

The Frick has been part of the New York Art Resources Consortium (NYARC), which also includes the Museum of Modern Art and Brooklyn Museum, since 2007. NYARC operates Arcade, an online catalog that combines the collections of the three museums' libraries. The Center for the History of Collecting, also founded in 2007, is also part of the library. The Frick is a member of the International Consortium of Photo Archives (PHAROS), which operates a database of digitized artworks from the collections of 14 art museums.

== Management ==
The Frick Collection is operated by a nonprofit organization of the same name, which is dedicated to conserving the artworks in the museum's collection. Axel Rüger was named the Frick's director in 2024, and Aimee Ng is the chief curator as of 2025. The director's position has been known as the Anna-Maria and Stephen Kellen Director since 2020, while the chief curator's position is known as the Peter Jay Sharp Chief Curator.

The museum's board of trustees originally comprised nine trustees and was largely composed of Frick family members. The board was relatively small during the 20th century, with nine trustees until the 1990s and eleven by 2003. Under Poulet's directorship, in the 2000s, the board was expanded by 10 members and was broadened to include more people from outside the Frick family. Poulet also introduced the Director's Circle, a group of 44 members who each give a minimum of $25,000 a year to the Frick Collection.

=== Admission and attendance ===
After the museum opened in 1935, it accommodated 5,000 visitors in its first week and 100,000 visitors in six months; at its peak, the museum saw 1,600 visitors in one day. At the end of 1936, the museum had seen 136,000 visitors, an average of 460 per day. In the 1970s, the museum recorded between 800 and 1,500 daily visitors. The number of annual visitors averaged 250,000 by the late 1990s, and annual attendance had increased to 350,000 by the early 2000s. The Frick Collection had a typical annual attendance of up to 300,000 in the 2010s, although it recorded 420,000 visitors in 2013 due to a particularly popular exhibit there. Shows in the 2010s attracted upwards of 4,000 daily visitors.

The Frick was originally free to enter but has charged an admission fee since 1976. The museum offers pay-as-you-wish hours one day of the week, in addition to free admission on First Fridays. Free admission is also provided to members of the Frick; students and staff of certain universities in New York City; certain demographic groups such as youth, senior citizens, and people with disabilities; and other groups such as military personnel. Frick Collection members receive several membership benefits, including a queue jump for exhibits. As part of the Culture Pass program, persons with cards from New York City's public libraries (Note: The Brooklyn Public Library, Queens Library, and New York Public Library) could also visit the museum for free with a Culture Pass, albeit with restrictions on the number of passes distributed. Until 2019, the Frick also sold the Connoisseur Pass, which also provided admission to the Morgan Library & Museum and Neue Galerie New York.

Children under the age of 10 are not allowed inside the museum; this restriction, intended to protect the paintings, has existed ever since the museum opened in 1935. As part of the same restriction, youths between 10 and 15 years old are allowed to enter only if there is an adult with them. The museum provides guided tours to small groups and school classes. Starting in the late 1990s, the museum provided complimentary audio guides to visitors; it later added the Bloomberg Connects smartphone app. The guides are offered in several languages and consist of handsets that provide information about the artworks and the subjects of each painting. The Frick also launched its website in the late 1990s; the website has been updated several times since then.

=== Funding ===
Frick's will established a $15 million endowment fund for what would become the Frick Collection museum. At the Frick Collection Inc.'s 50th anniversary in 1970, the museum's endowment had grown to $40 million, and it received more than $1 million a year in income. By 1997, the Frick Collection had an operating budget of $10 million and an endowment of $170 million; this increased in the mid-2000s to a budget of $18.8 million and an endowment of $200 million. As of 2015, the museum had an endowment of $315 million.

== Reception and commentary ==
=== 20th-century commentary ===
In 1912, before the collection had become a museum, Town & Country magazine wrote that Frick owned "one of the greatest private collections of paintings in the world". Art World magazine said in 1917 that the Frick House contained "one of the most remarkable assemblies of old paintings in the United States belonging to a private collector", rivaling the collection of the former Lenox Library on the same site. When the Frick Collection opened to the public in 1935, a critic for The New York Times wrote that the museum's "informality in the distribution of works of art has even its amusing overtones", while another commentator in The Christian Science Monitor regarded the collection as having "long been recognized as one of the world's treasuries of art". One of the few detractors was Lewis Mumford, who felt that the other objects in the house diverted visitors' attention from the visual art.

A Los Angeles Times critic wrote in 1941 that few other art collections in the U.S. "so completely [exemplified] a great period in American art collecting". The New York Times wrote in 1969 that the Frick was one of the world's best "residence-museums" along with the Isabella Stewart Gardner Museum and the Wallace Collection. A critic for the Christian Science Monitor said in 1971 that the collection's paintings seemed to fit the building because Frick had "to be sure he felt at home with them". Another critic, writing for The Post-Standard of Syracuse, New York, in 1975, praised the museum's "tranquility and superb decorative arts coupled with masterworks".

John Russell of the Times said in 1981 that "The Frick is loved for its unpushy ways, for the largesse of its hospitality and for the high quality of what it has to show." In a review for the Christian Science Monitor the same year, Madeline Lee wrote that the museum was special because of its courtyard and reflecting pool; another reviewer for the same newspaper said "The Frick is the only museum I know whose collection consists almost exclusively of great or nearly great art." GQ magazine said that "the most renowned—and probably best—combined house and art collection of a so-called 'robber baron' is that of Henry Clay Frick". Bryan Miller of the Times wrote in 1987 that there were "artistic gems in every room", and Grace Glueck of the same paper called it "the enclave of masterpieces". A Los Angeles Times critic in 1990 said the Frick Collection "represents the aristocratic aspirations of turn-of-the-century robber barons". Another New York Times critic called the museum "as frumpy and elegant as a dowager queen", describing the quality of its collection and the Frick House. A Globe and Mail reviewer said the museum was extremely peaceful and was "a more comfortable museum than most" because it used to serve as a residence.

=== 21st-century commentary ===
A 2000 poll by Travel Holiday magazine ranked the Frick Collection as the third-best art museum in the U.S. Upon the museum's 75th anniversary in 2010, a Wall Street Journal critic wrote that, although the museum lacked major shows and had not undergone a high-profile renovation, it "quietly attracts a steady stream of about 300,000 visitors each year who come to see one of the most extraordinary assemblages of fine and decorative arts in the world". A reviewer for the Condé Nast Traveler wrote that the museum was "exactly the right scale, everything in the collection is worth seeing, and can be viewed in an hour or less", while a New Yorker writer said that "you feel more than welcomed—you feel invited, like a family friend" at the Frick House. A critic for the Daily Telegraph wrote in 2014 that the Frick was "the best small museum in New York, perfect if you don't fancy dealing with a crush of people at MoMA or the Met".

When the museum was temporarily relocated to 945 Madison Avenue, one critic wrote that the temporary building was "an exercise in contrasts" with the Frick House's decorations and that "the vibe here is serious and meditative". Another critic wrote for Vogue that the Frick Madison was a "shock to the senses in every way" but that "the collection comes directly to the fore" amid that building's bare walls, and writers for the Financial Times and the Wall Street Journal similarly said that the spartan setting helped highlight the collection itself. Holland Cotter of The New York Times wrote that the museum's collection "looked glamorous as always but lonely for" the Frick House.

After the house's renovation was finished, Wall Street Journal writer Eric Gibson wrote that the relocations of some artwork had "added depth and texture to the Frick experience". while Cotter wrote that the museum "feels organic" because of how the artwork was arranged. A writer for Art News said the museum "offers a dream of art, where images enchant as much as instruct". A writer for the Observer said in 2025 that the collection persisted because Frick had "combined ambition with discipline, curiosity with rigor".

== See also ==
- Cooper–Hewitt, National Design Museum, a similar museum further north on Fifth Avenue
- List of museums in New York City
- List of museums and cultural institutions in New York City
