= Helen Sanger =

American librarian (1923–2020)

- Born: September 21, 1923; Java
- Died: July 30, 2020 (aged 96); New York City
- Education: Smith College, Columbia University
- Known for: Author, librarian

Helen Sanger (September 21, 1923 – July 30, 2020) served as the fifth chief librarian of the Frick Art Reference Library and the institution's first Andrew W. Mellon Chief Librarian, a position inaugurated in 1990.

== Education ==
Born in the Dutch colony of Java and raised in Hong Kong, Sanger received her early education at the Peak School and the British Central School. After the outbreak of World War II, her mother Lonni Wheeler Sanger, born Louise Wernicke in 1891 in Berlin, relocated to the United States with Helen and her two sisters, Charlotte and Eleanor. Helen attended the University High School in Oakland, California, and the Walnut Hill School for Girls in Natick, Massachusetts, before matriculating to Smith College. She graduated in 1946 (cum laude), having taken courses in economics, history, art history, and art and design. In 1953, she was awarded a M.S. in Library Science from Columbia University.

== Career ==
Sanger's first position at the Library was in the Photoarchive, but she later transferred to Public Services. She was appointed the Chief Librarian of the Library in 1978, taking over the position from Mildred Steinbach.

Sanger contributed to and edited Katharine McCook Knox's The Story of the Frick Art Reference Library: The Early Years, which was published in 1979, and in 1981, she established the Library's Conservation Department. After the death of the Library's founder Helen Clay Frick in 1984, Sanger oversaw the merger of the Library with The Frick Collection. She also managed "The Spanish Project," the Library's response to the United States government's general request to American research institutions to initiate "major international projects" that would strengthen ties between the United States and Spain in preparation for the Columbian Quincentenary in 1992. The project initiated by the Library had three aims, all of which were supervised by Sanger: to complete an annotated checklist of more than 7,000 Spanish artists active between the fourth and twentieth centuries; to hone the skills of graduate students from Spain and the United States in art-historical research and introduce them to database creation; and to augment considerably the Photoarchive's holdings in Spanish art.

Sanger retired in 1994, although she continued to volunteer at the Library for the next several years.

== Family ==
Helen was the sister of Eleanor Sanger Riger (1929–1993), an Emmy Award-winning television writer and producer and the first woman network sports producer. Helen and Eleanor had an older sister, Charlotte (Lonni) Sanger Ward, who died on August 12, 1955.

== Publications ==
- Spanish Artists from the Fourth to the Twentieth Centuries, 4 vols., 1993–96
