= Art historical photo archive =

Art historical photo archives (or photo archives) are collections of reproductions of works of art that document paintings, drawings, prints, sculpture, architecture and sometimes installation photos. They are essential resource tools for the study of art history. Image collections deepen understanding of specific objects of art and the careers of individual artists as they also provide the means for a comparative approach to the study of artists’ works, national schools and period styles. The documentation that accompanies the images can also reveal patterns of art collecting, art market fluctuations and the changeable nature of public opinion. Photo archives build their collections and gather documentation for the works of art they record through purchases, gifts and photography campaigns. Information about ownership, condition, attribution, and subject identification is recorded at the time of acquisition and is frequently updated.

== History ==
The founders of important art historical photo archives believed that a deep and broad visual knowledge was necessary for the study of art history. These pioneers, including Richard Hamann, Aby Warburg, Sir Robert Witt, William Martin Conway, Bernard Berenson, Cornelis Hofstede de Groot and Helen Clay Frick, were the first to realize the potential of photography as a means to provide researchers with materials that strengthen the documentation and interpretation of works of art. The photo archives they founded in the first half of the 20th century, now part of FotoMarburg, the Warburg Institute, the Witt Library, Villa I Tatti, the Rijksbureau voor Kunsthistorische Documentatie, and the Frick Art Reference Library Photoarchive, are still used by countless researchers in the first half of the 21st century.

== Uses ==
- Art historical photo archives collect images of works without regard to trends or the popular reception of any given artist's work. They thus retain files for artists not held in high esteem but whose reputations among scholars may change in years to come.
- Many of the works of art recorded in photo archives are unpublished or relatively inaccessible since they reside in private collections or public institution storerooms.
- Art historical photo archives provide a forum for scholarly dialogue across the decades, affording art historians the opportunity to record opinions regarding attribution or current ownership of works they know well.
- As art history and art connoisseurship have matured, photo archives have played a key role, the fruits of which are most obvious in publications such as Bernard Berenson's lists of works by Italian artists and Richard Offner’s Corpus of Florentine Painting (today continued by Miklos Boskovits). The refinement of attributions of works of art recorded in a photo archive can lead to the reevaluation of an artist's career or the identification of a new, previously unnamed master. In this way, a photo archive functions in much the same way as the curatorial records of museum drawings departments, where annotations by scholars of several generations record the various attributions ascribed to the work over time.
- Photo archives aid researchers in their connoisseurship skills since they include copies, forgeries and pastiches.
- Multiple images of a single work of art help scholars trace the physical changes that have affected the object through time, damage, and conservation. Photo archives often document the full visual record of a given work of art, information that is unlikely to be published because of financial limitations.
- Photo archives enable discovery and innovative scholarship as researchers browse within and across artist files.
- Photo archives are essential to the study of works of art that have been destroyed or lost as a result of war, fire or theft.

== Future ==
In 2009 the Courtauld Institute in collaboration with the Kunsthistorisches Institut in Florenz organized a series of conferences that were held in London, Florence and New York to discuss the future of photo archives. They felt that an examination of the origins of photo archives can help guide and shape their future and, at the same time, convey to the uninitiated how image resources continue to be used as essential elements for art historical research. Few doubt that if Helen Frick, Robert Witt, or W.M. Conway had lived to see the potential of digitizing the photo archives they established in the 1920s, they would have dedicated enormous resources and careful thought to realizing the digital future. However, there is a problem for photo archives in that currently they have no copyright claim to the majority of the images in their collection and thus they are unable to display them on the web. It is therefore now their task to develop and promote a new model for access and use of these extraordinary resources that will maximize the opportunities of current and future technical advances in a way that suits the demands of today's scholars. This selection process, which is implicit in digitization projects and will inevitably exclude some images, renders the analog archive as indispensable as ever in the digital era. Whatever the method of delivery, whether the photograph itself or its digital surrogate, photo archives remain essential to the study of art history. The conferences produced the Florence Declaration, which made several recommendations for the preservation of analogue photo archives. As of May 2011, nearly 500 scholars had signed the Declaration.
