= Ruth Savord =

Librarian

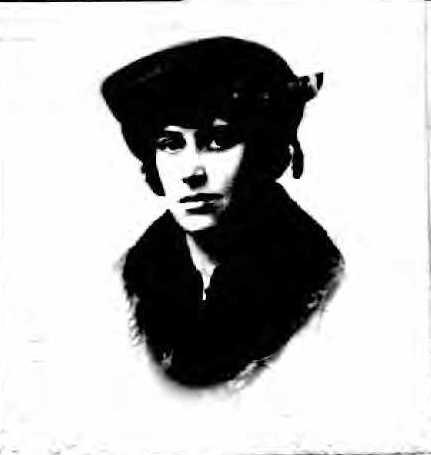
- Savord's passport application photograph
- Born: November 2, 1894; Sandusky, Ohio
- Died: February 25, 1966 (aged 71); Arizona
- Education: Case Western Reserve University (1913–14); University of Illinois (1916–17)
- Occupations: author, special librarian
- Employer: Council on Foreign Relations

Catherine Ruth Savord (November 2, 1894 – February 25, 1966) was a librarian and the author of several books and articles on library work. She served as president of the Special Libraries Association, the first Chief Librarian of the Frick Art Reference Library, and the head special librarian of Council on Foreign Relations.

== Early life ==
Ruth Savord was born November 2, 1894, to parents Alexander J. and Jennie (Kelley) Savord in Sandusky, Ohio. She graduated from Sandusky High School and attended the school of Library Science at Case Western Reserve University in Cleveland from 1913 to 1914. She later enrolled at the University of Illinois from 1916 to 1917, where she held a position in the Catalog Department of the university library.

== Career ==
Savord began her career in approximately 1910, when she became an apprentice at the Sandusky Library. After her graduation from Case Western University, she worked in the Catalog Department of the Cleveland Public Library. During World War I, she relocated to New York City and worked for the Western Union Telegraph Company; after the war, she was employed by the Newark Public Library.

=== Frick Art Reference Library ===
Savord assisted Helen Clay Frick in organizing the Frick Art Reference Library, an institution dedicated to serving the art and art history research community, which Miss Frick had founded in 1920 as a memorial to her father, the collector Henry Clay Frick. Savord had been recommended by a close friend, and Miss Frick was impressed by Savord's "excellent mind," work ethic, and sense of humor. In the first entry in the library's diary, dated Monday, 8 November 1920, a note in longhand records that "Ruth Savord began work as a librarian ... She and Miss Frick began cutting up a few things on hand and working out forms, etc." — a reference to the Library's early collection of study images, many of which were removed from pamphlets and catalogs. Early in 1921, Savord accompanied Miss Frick on a six-week research trip to London where they studied the famous photograph collection of the British art historian Sir Robert Witt in his library at 32 Portman Square. On their return, Savord developed a cataloging system for the Frick Art Reference Library's growing collection of study images, which involved the adaption of principles ordinarily applied to books, and launched two initiatives: the development of a book collection and a program to photograph works of art in private collections, objects that were little known to the scholarly community. Savord also assisted in developing the staff of the Library and acquiring rare sales catalogs, a collection that has become one of the largest of its kind in the United States.

Savord left her position at the Frick Art Reference Library in 1924 to assist in the reorganization of the library of the General Education Board, where Marguerite M. Chamberlain served as her assistant from 1925 to 1927.

=== Council on Foreign Relations ===
After holding positions with the International Education Board as well as the advertising firm Batten, Barton, Durstine and Osborn, Savord extended her field into international relations and actively contributed to the organization of the library of the Council on Foreign Relations in New York City. She served as the institution's Librarian from 1932 to about 1962. Her work for the Council led to the compilation of a directory on international affairs, her first major publication.

=== Special Libraries Association ===
Savord served as the President of the Special Libraries Association from 1934 to 1935, heading the SLA's "Constitution Revision Committee" as Special chairman. She also served on the Ways and Means Committee and as ex-officio of the Publications Committee.

In regard to her field, she noted that special librarianship "offers an outlet ... for the one whose primary interest is in people, in new and interesting contacts, and in books as tools; for the one with the sleuthing instinct for the obscure or the not-yet-in-print information which is demanded today by our highly competitive world. It is not for the one seeking a quiet atmosphere of repose; nor for the one who is interested primarily in increasing the desire to read and in fostering the cultural side of life."

In a special session on education for special librarians at SLA's annual meeting of 1938 in Kansas City, Savord presented a paper on the best education for a special librarian. On the differences in objectives and purposes between special and general libraries, her presentation highlighted the detrimental side effects for the profession created by schools that do not illustrate the differences in their librarianship education and training.

== Publications ==
=== Articles ===
- "Training for Special Librarianship." Special Libraries, Vol. 29, No. 7, September 1938, pp. 207–212. Full issue available.
- "What Special Libraries Can Do For Civilian Defense." Special Libraries, Vol. 33, No. 1, January 1942, pp. 11–14. Full issue.
- "Structure and Interrelations of SLA Groups." Special Libraries, Vol. 39, No. 7, September 1948, pp. 218–225. Full issue available.
- "Source Material." Foreign Affairs, Vol. 35, No. 4, July 1957, pp. 721–726. JSTOR 20031265.

=== Books ===
- Directory of American Agencies Concerned with the Study of International Affairs. Introduction by Isaiah Bowman. New York: Council on Foreign Relations, 1931.
- Union List of Periodicals in Special Libraries of the New York Metropolitan District. Edited with Pearl Keefer. Special Libraries Association, 1931.
- American Agencies Interested in International Affairs. New York: Council on Foreign Relations, 1942.

=== Pamphlets ===
- Special Librarianship as a Career. Sponsored by the Special Libraries Association. New London: Institute of Women's Professional Relations, 1942.
- "World Affairs: A Foreign Service Reading List." World Affairs, Vol. 112, No. 4, Winter 1949. New York: Council on Foreign Relations.

"PART II — a supplement to the December, 1949, issue of the journal."

=== Reports ===
- Report on the Development of Education in International Relations in the United States: Submitted to the League of Nations Section of Intellectual Cooperation, May 1932. 1932.
