= Héléna Joséphine Robelet =

French painter (1817–1889)

- Born: 10 July 1817; Gravelines, France
- Died: 18 May 1889 (aged 71); Saint-Omer, France
- Education: Alexandre-Xavier Lebour
- Known for: Portraiture; Still life Miniatures
- Movement: Romanticism; French School
- Awards: Paris Salon Honorable Mention (1857)

Héléna Joséphine Robelet (10 July 1817 – 18 May 1889) was a 19th-century French painter and miniaturist of the French School, associated with the Romantic movement. Signaled on her works as Héléna Robelet, her historical record is occasionally subject to bibliographical confusion with the artist Héléna Joséphine Robert. Specializing in portraiture, still lifes, and miniatures, she exhibited regularly at the Paris Salon between 1857 and 1887.

== Biography ==
Born into an upper-class family in Gravelines, Robelet studied fine art under Alexandre-Xavier Lebour in Saint-Omer. During her training, she formed a close friendship with fellow painter Coralie Ferey, a classmate under Lebour. In 1847, Robelet executed a notable portrait of her brother-in-law, Captain Louis Léopold Jean Marie Lombardeau, who was married to her sister Caroline Joséphine Robelet and who later became a Colonel in the French Army's 39th Infantry Regiment.

Robelet made her debut at the Paris Salon of 1857, where her work received critical acclaim and earned an Honorable Mention. Her artistic talent was notably acknowledged by the prominent aristocrat and politician Félix Le Sergeant de Monnecove, who publicly praised the exquisite quality of her paintings at one of the Salon's annual exhibitions.

She continued to participate in subsequent Salons, including the milestone exhibition of 1859, where her presentations were extensively indexed in official artistic rosters and salon reviews. Her recorded exhibition timeline also spans the Salon of 1861, where her listed works were officially cataloged. Robelet remained in Saint-Omer later in life, where she died in 1889.

== Legacy and collections ==
In keeping with the social conventions of her upper-class background, she did not actively seek commercial advancement or public renown, yet her work is preserved in institutional public collections. Her floral painting, Bouquet de fleurs, is held by the Musée Condé in Chantilly where the catalog acknowledges the historical attribution cross-over with Héléna Joséphine Robert. Additional examples of her work are housed in the Musée de l'hôtel Sandelin in Saint-Omer.

Research and archival files dedicated to her career are maintained internationally at the Louvre Museum in Paris (via the documentation files of the Département des Peintures), the Courtauld Institute of Art in London, and the Frick Art Research Library in New York City.
