= Ethelwyn Manning =

American librarian

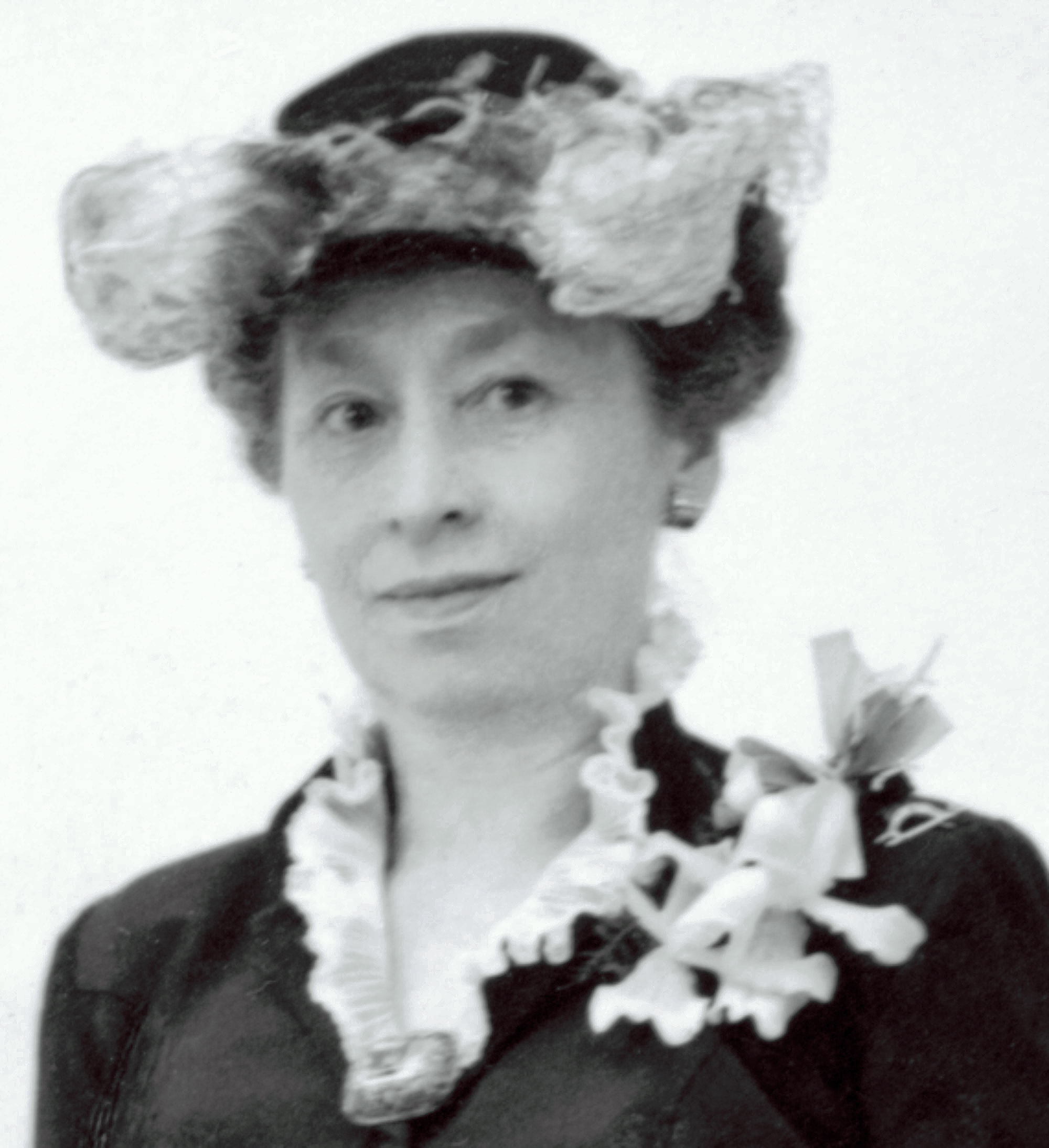
- Born: 23 November 1885; Newtown Center, Massachusetts, United States
- Died: 1 June 1972 (aged 86)
- Education: Smith College, Simmons College
- Known for: Librarian, Monuments, Fine Arts, and Archives program

Ethelwyn Manning (23 November 1885 – 1 June 1972) was the second Chief Librarian of the Frick Art Reference Library. During World War II, she assisted the Committee of the American Council of Learned Societies (ACLS) on Protection of Cultural Treasures in War Areas, later known as the Monuments, Fine Arts, and Archives program (MFAA).

== Education ==
Manning graduated from Smith College in 1908 and the school of Library Science at Simmons College in 1911. She also studied at the Training School for Children's Librarians at the Carnegie Library, Pittsburgh.

== Career ==
Manning began her career as a Children's Librarian at the Brooklyn Public Library in 1909. She subsequently held positions in the public libraries of Burlington, Iowa, Cedar Rapids, Iowa, and Milton, Massachusetts. In 1917, she was appointed Head Cataloger of the Amherst College Library in Massachusetts.

In September 1924, Manning was appointed the second Chief Librarian of the Frick Art Reference Library, a research institute dedicated to promoting the study of art history and related subjects that had been founded four years earlier by Helen Clay Frick as a memorial to her father, the collector Henry Clay Frick. Manning worked at the Frick Art Reference Library for twenty-four years, overseeing the institution's transfer from its original location in a two and one-half story building at 6 East 71st Street to its present thirteen story building located at 10 East 71st Street. During World War II, when the Committee of the American Council of Learned Societies (ACLS) on Protection of Cultural Treasures in War Areas was in residence at the Library, she worked alongside art historians on the Committee to prepare maps detailing the location of art treasures and landmarks in war zones and in danger of Nazi plundering. Manning was also instrumental in developing the institution's collection of study photographs of works of art, acquiring thousands of reproductions from European photographers and hiring photographers in the United States to travel through the country and photograph inaccessible paintings in private collections. The resulting collection, which presently comprises more than one million images, documents the Western artistic tradition.
