= Hannah Johnson Howell =

American librarian (1905–1988)

- Born: 22 June 1905; Oskaloosa, Iowa, United States
- Died: 21 May 1988 (aged 82)
- Education: William Penn University, University of Chicago, School of Library Service of Columbia University
- Known for: Librarian

Hannah Johnson Howell (22 June 1905 – 21 May 1988) was the third Chief Librarian of the Frick Art Reference Library.

== Education ==
Howell graduated from Penn College, Oskaloosa, Iowa in 1925. She received a Bachelor of Philosophy from the University Chicago in 1927 and a graduate degree from the school of Library Service at Columbia University in 1928.

== Career ==
In 1928, the year of her graduation from library school, Howell began her career at the Frick Art Reference Library. She originally worked in the Photoarchive, but later became the reference librarian of the Library's reading room. After serving as an assistant librarian from 1942 to 1947, Howell was appointed the third Chief Librarian of the Library in 1948. She held the position until 1970. During her tenure, the Frick Art Reference Library dramatically increased its collection of materials, including its holdings of study photographs. After her retirement from the Library, she worked as a consultant librarian.

== Publications ==
- "The Frick Art Reference Library." College Art Journal XI, no. 2 (1951): 123–6.
