= New York Art Resources Consortium =

The New York Art Resources Consortium (NYARC) consists of the research libraries of three leading art museums in New York City: The Brooklyn Museum, The Frick Collection, and The Museum of Modern Art. With funding from The Andrew W. Mellon Foundation, NYARC was formed in 2006 to facilitate collaboration that results in enhanced resources for research communities. Called a groundbreaking partnership, NYARC also provides a framework for collaboration among art research libraries.

== History ==
The NYARC libraries have a long history of collaborating on projects, dating back to the 1980s and the establishment of the Art Museum Library Consortium. The collaborative efforts of the Art Museum Library Consortium resulted in the retrospective conversion of the Brooklyn Museum, The Metropolitan Museum of Art, The Museum of Modern Art and the Museum of Fine Arts in Boston card catalogs into an online format.

In 2004 the libraries of the Brooklyn Museum, The Frick Collection, The Metropolitan Museum of Art and The Museum of Modern Art were awarded a planning grant by the Andrew W. Mellon Foundation to conduct an environmental scan and identify potential areas for collaboration. This grant resulted in a comprehensive planning document for NYARC, which serves as the consortium's roadmap.

The Metropolitan Museum of Art, a founding member of NYARC, withdrew from the consortium in 2011; however, the NYARC libraries and the libraries of The Metropolitan Museum of Art continue to work together on collaborative projects on an ad hoc basis.

== Projects ==
Since NYARC was formed in 2006 the members have been involved in a number of initiatives. Past and current initiatives are listed alphabetically below.

- NYARC Discovery: Containing over 1,000,000 records, NYARC Discovery is the online catalog for the Frick Art Research Library and the libraries of the Brooklyn Museum and The Museum of Modern Art. The catalog, formerly known as Arcade, was launched in 2009.

In 2011, records documenting over 125,000 cataloged works of art from the Frick's Photoarchive were added to Arcade, creating the first publicly accessible interface for this rich collection.

- ARTstor Brooklyn Museum Costumes: ARTstor is collaborating with The Metropolitan Museum of Art to share approximately 5,800 images of American and European costumes and accessories from the Brooklyn Museum in the Digital Library.
- JSTOR 19th Century American Art Periodicals: JSTOR's Arts & Sciences VIII Collection will include a group of rare 19th and early 20th century American Art periodicals digitized as part of a special project undertaken with the Metropolitan Museum of Art, the Frick Collection, and the Brooklyn Museum.
- JSTOR Auction Catalogs Beta: JSTOR is collaborating with the Thomas J. Watson Library at The Metropolitan Museum of Art and the Frick Art Research Library in a pilot project funded by the Andrew W. Mellon Foundation to understand how auction catalogs can best be preserved for the long term and made most easily accessible for scholarly use.
- Knoedler Gallery Digital Collection: The Thomas J. Watson Library at The Metropolitan Museum of Art and the Frick Art Research Library are currently digitizing the Knoedler Gallery exhibition checklists and pamphlets covering the period 1877-1932. The project has been completed.
- Macbeth Gallery Digital Collection: The Thomas J. Watson Library at The Metropolitan Museum of Art and the Frick Art Reference Library digitized the exhibition checklists and pamphlets of the Macbeth Gallery in the fall of 2008.
- NYC-7: Seven New York institutions - Brooklyn Museum Library, Columbia University Libraries, Frick Art Research Library, Metropolitan Museum of Art Thomas J. Watson Library, Museum of Modern Art Library, New York Public Library and New York University Libraries - are engaged in collaboration discussions.
- OCLC Collection Analysis: A project to analyze the collections of the four NYARC members was completed in August 2008 by OCLC's RLG Programs division in order to provide the libraries with information about the NYARC collections.
