= Institute of Art History, Philipps-Universität Marburg =

University institute for art history in Germany

Coordinates: 50.8100°N 8.7748°E

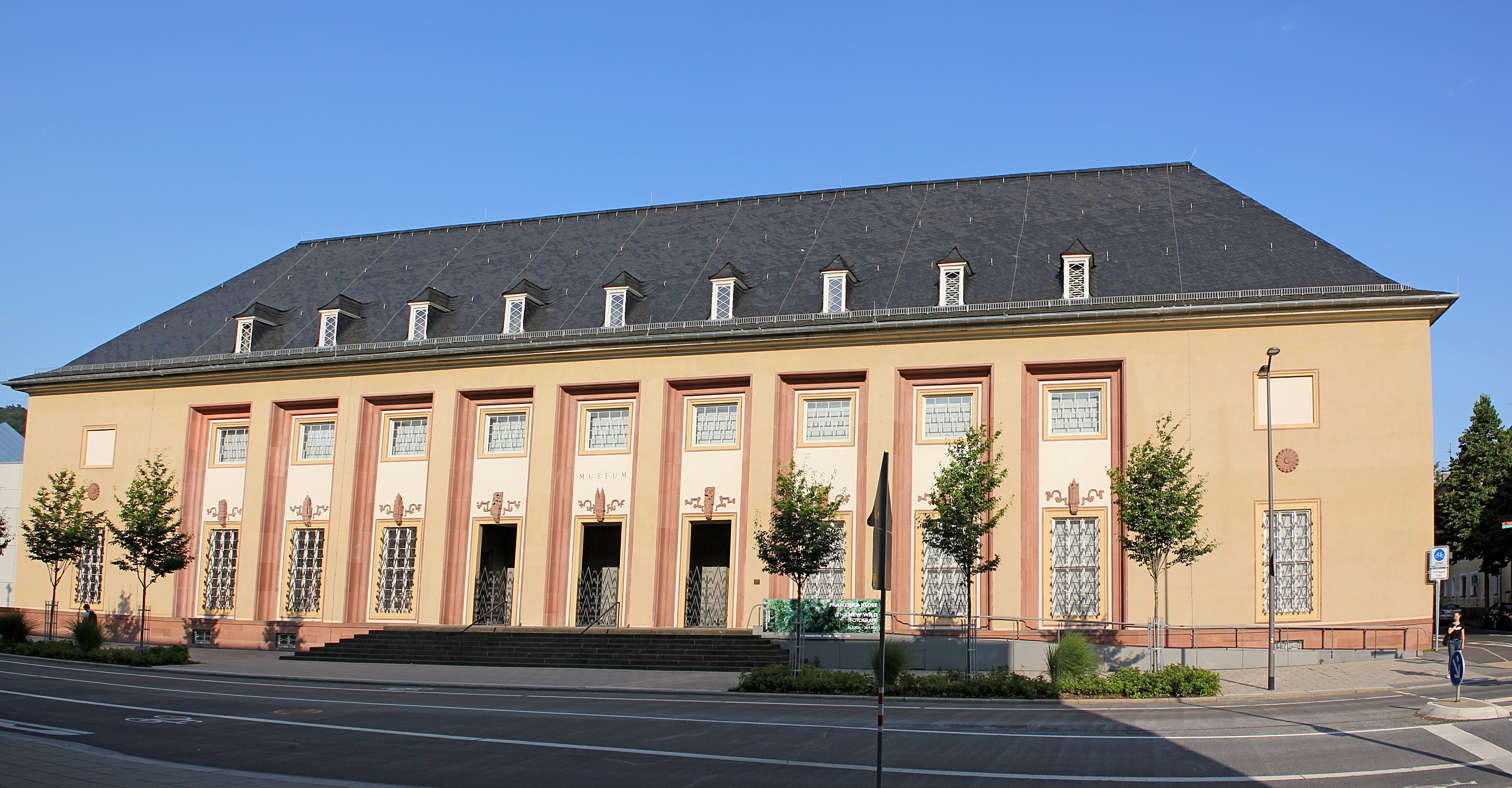
West view of the Institute of Art History and the art museum.

The Art History Institute of the University of Marburg is a university-affiliated institute in the German state of Hesse for the study of art history. It emphasizes an historical perspectives on art and its influence up until the present-day. This approach includes cooperation with other fields of research as well as museums and other art-related institutions in Marburg and Hesse. The institute shares the historical art building with the archive Foto Marburg, which collects photographic sources on art and architecture from across Germany and Europe, as well as the Marburg Art Museum.

== History ==
Art history has been a field of research at the University of Marburg since the middle of the 19th century, when lectures on post-ancient art were given by Johannes Friedrich Lange and later Carl Justi. The history of art was originally treated as a part of archeology, until in 1924 art historian Richard Hamann and the university curator Ernst von Hülsen developed the idea of an institute dedicated to the field of art and humanities. Since Marburg was late in establishing a permanent professorial chair for art history compared to its counterparts elsewhere in Germany, Hamann as the first chair was able to design the institute without having to consider preexisting traditions. On the occasion of the university's 400th anniversary in July 1927 the building (which is now called the Kunstgebäude der Philipps-Universität Marburg) was opened.

It is one of the first examples of a building designed specifically for art history research, teaching and the corresponding resources. The building was fully renovated between 2013 and 2018. The geographical closeness of various fields and archives housed in the building are meant to encourage interdisciplinary studies, originally also including the interactive study of objects and artistic techniques additionally to the usual curriculum of studying fine arts and architecture. However the institute teaching the creation of art rather than the studying its history moved to a different building in 1980. The interdisciplinary approach also facilitated the idea of photography as an important tool for art history, which led to producing and accumulating a large photographic archive. As "Bildarchiv Foto Marburg - Deutsches Dokumentationszentrum für Kunstgeschichte" (Image archive photo Marburg - German documentary centrum for art history) this collection continues to be used and increased.

== Research areas ==
(Sources:)

- History and theory of Bildwissenschaft, especially photography
- History of the field of art history
- Methods of art historical documentation
- Digital art history, digital humanities and cultural studies
- History of Architecture and images in Germany and France from the Renaissance to the present.
- European court culture
- Art in the GDR (Arbeitskreis Kunst in der DDR)
- Materiality and the concept of works in contemporary art
- Representation of Foreignness and Strangers; cultural transfer between Orient and Occident

== Publications ==
The Marburger Jahrbuch für Kunstwissenschaft, a yearly journal for art history, has been published in collaboration with Foto Marburg since 1924. It includes articles about the history of European arts and culture as well as theory from the Classical Era until today. Its current editors are Ingo Herklotz und Hubert Locher.

== Literature ==
- Katharina Krause: Ein Kunstinstitut für Marburg. Konzeptionen und ihr architektonischer Ausdruck. In: alma mater philippina, Ausgabe Wintersemester 1998/1999, pp. 12–18.
- Thomas Jahn: Das Kunstinstitut der Philipps-Universität Marburg. In: Jörg Jochen Bruns (ed.): Marburg-Bilder. Eine Ansichtssache. Zeugnisse auf fünf Jahrhunderten. (= Marburger Stadtschriften zur Geschichte und Kultur, vol. 53.) vol. 2, Marburg 1996, pp. 321–356.
- Hubert Lütcke: Der Jubiläumsneubau des Kunstinstituts der Universität Marburg. In: Zeitschrift für Bauwesen, vol. 80, 1930, pp. 1–12 (digitalized by Zentral- und Landesbibliothek Berlin).
- Karin Brandes et al.: Richard Hamann und seine Schüler. Eine Chronik des kunstgeschichtlichen Seminars der Philipps-Universität Marburg, Marburg 1990.
- Kathryn Brusch: Marburg, Harvard and purpose-built architecture for art history, 1927. In: Elizabeth Mansfield (ed.): Art History and Its Institutions. The Nineteenth Century. London 2002, pp. 65–84.

== External sources ==
- Website of the Institute of Art History Marburg (in German).
- Website of the Philipps-Universität Marburg
- Website of the Art Museum in Marburg (in German).
- The institut in "Portal Kunstgeschichte" (in German).
