= Photo archive =

Photo archive may refer to

- Photographic archives maintained by galleries, libraries, archives and museums. Sometimes referred to as art historical photo archives
- Archives of photographs licensed for use in stock photography
  - List of online image archives
