= Jeremiah D. M. Ford =

American educator & author (1873–1958)

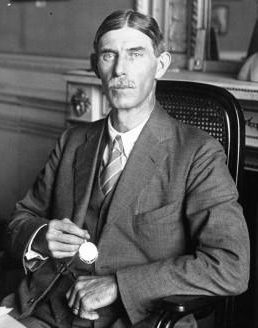
- Ford (1925)
- Born: Jeremiah Denis Mathias Ford; July 2, 1873; Cambridge, Massachusetts, US
- Died: November 13, 1958 (aged 85); Cambridge, Massachusetts, US
- Spouse: Anna Winifred Fearns
- Children: 4

Academic background
- Education: Science and Art Department, Harvard Law School, Harvard College

Academic work
- Institutions: Harvard University (1895–1943)
- Notable students: Chandler Rathfon Post

Jeremiah Denis Mathias Ford (1873–1958) was an American educator and author. He was the Smith Professor Emeritus of the French and Spanish Languages and Literature at Harvard University from 1907 to 1943. He was the youngest-ever to be appointed a professor at Harvard, the first Catholic faculty, and the last ever appointed as Chairman of the Department of Romance Languages from 1911 to 1943.

== Biography ==
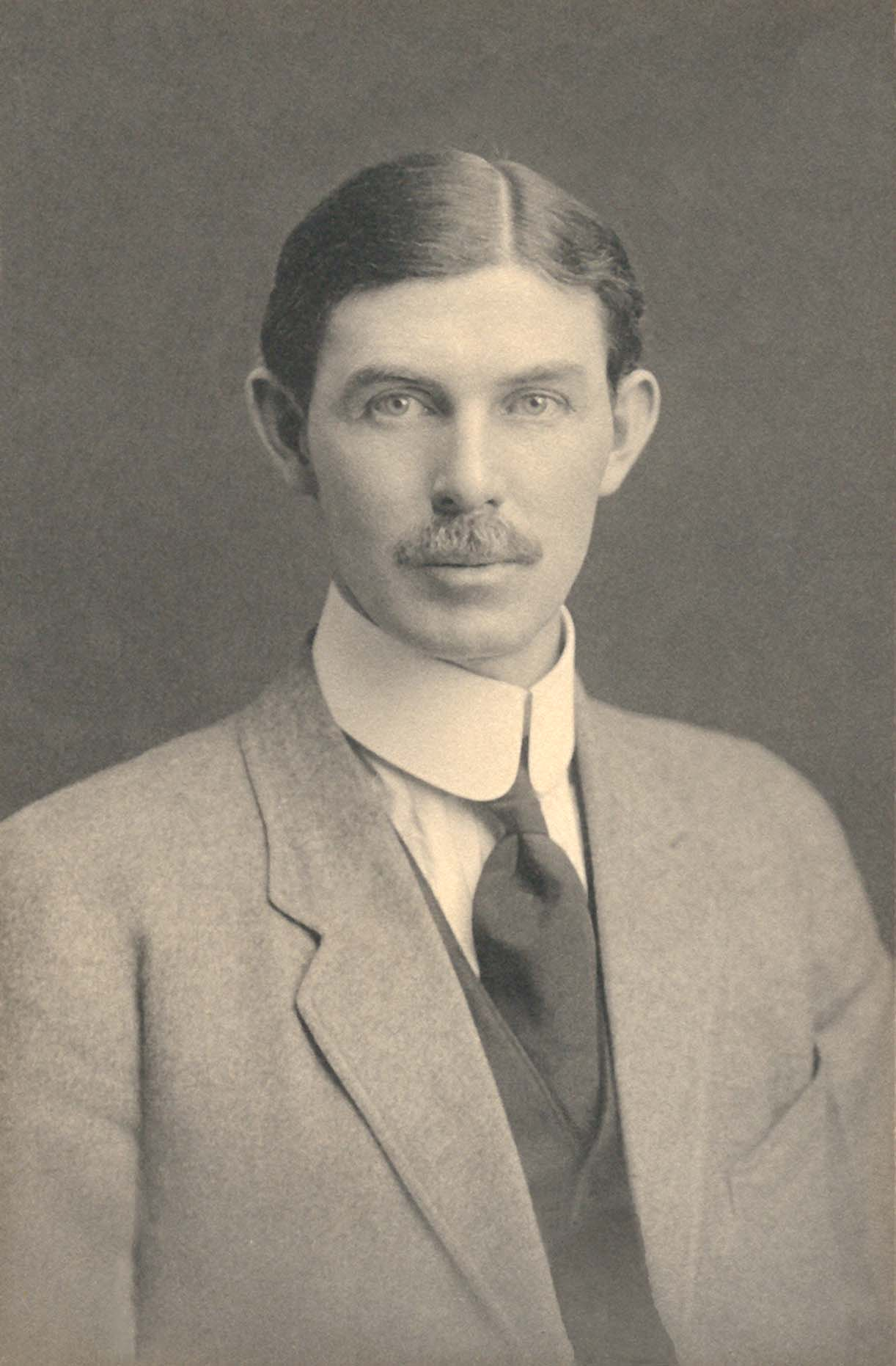
Ford as a young man

Ford was born 2 July 1873, in Cambridge, Massachusetts. He graduated from Thorndike Grammar School, Cambridge, Massachusetts, in 1886. From 1886 to 1887, he attended the North Monastery Christian Brothers School in Cork, Ireland.

He then attended the Science and Art Department in South Kensington, London, England, from 1887 to 1888. In 1888, he was awarded Distinction in Chemistry and Math in the Science and Art Department Examinations.

He was awarded First Scholar & Gold Medal in English in the Junior Grade, in 1888, and the Silver Medal for German, in 1889, from the Intermediate Education Board, Dublin, Ireland.

He attended Harvard Law School from 1891 to 1892, attaining honors his first year. He then transferred, and attended Harvard College, receiving an A.B., Phi Beta Kappa, summa cum laude, in 1894; A.M., in 1895; and Ph.D, in Romance Philology, in 1897.

Ford was the first Catholic ever hired by Harvard University, he was appointed Instructor in French and Italian in 1895, Harvard Harris Fellow in Romance Philology, Instructor-in-Residence to l'Universitê de Paris, from 1897 to 1898, Instructor in French and Spanish in 1898, Instructor in Romance Languages, in 1899, and Assistant Professor of Romance Languages at Harvard University.

Then, the youngest professor ever at Harvard, he was appointed Smith Professor of the French & Spanish Languages & Literature at Harvard, in 1907, a chair that had been vacant since 1886. He held that Chair until his retirement in 1943, when he became Smith Professor Emeritus.

Notable student's of Fords included Chandler Rathfon Post.

On January 1, 1902, he married Anna Winifred Fearns, in Cambridge, Massachusetts. They had four children. He died at his home in Cambridge on November 13, 1958.

== Languages ==
- Arabic
- Basque
- Gaelic
- German
- Romanian
- Sanskrit
- Romance languages and their variants.

== Courses taught at Harvard ==
- Catalan
- French
- Old French
- Italian
- Old Italian
- Portuguese
- Old Portuguese
- Provençal
- Old Provençal
- Spanish
- Old Spanish
- Vulgar Latin
- Comparative Romance Phonology & Morphology
- Comparative Philology
- Comparative Romance Linguistics
- Novel & Tale in Romance Literature
- Romance Philology
- Problems in the Syntax of Romance Languages
- Historical French Syntax
- French Reading
- Translation, Grammar, & Composition
- General View of French Literature
- Old French Literature
- History of French Literature Prior to the 14th Century
- French Literature of the 14th & 15th Centuries
- Historical French Syntax
- The Works of Dante
- Italian Literature of the 15th & 16th Centuries
- The History of the Novel and Tale in Italy & Spain from the Mediaeval Period to the 18th Century
- Portuguese Language and Literature
- Old Portuguese Lyric Verse
- The Works of Camões
- The Works of Gil Vicente
- The Works of Sâ de Miranda
- Relations of Provençal Literature to European Literature in other Tongues
- General View of Spanish Literature
- Golden Age and Modern Spanish Literature
- Early Spanish Literature, Spanish Literature to the 16th Century
- The Poem of the Cid
- Spanish Literature of the 16th & 17th Centuries
- Spanish Prose & Poetry of the 18th & 19th Centuries
- Latin-American Studies
- Relations of Spanish Literature to European Literature in other Tongues
- Relations of Latin-American Literature to Literatures in Other Tongues.

== Honorary degrees ==
- Docteur-ès-Lettres from the Université Toulouse, France, on 21 Mar 1922.
- Doctor of Letters from the National University of Ireland, Dublin, Ireland, on 28 Oct 1932.
- Degree of Doctor of Letters from Trinity College, Dublin, Ireland, on 05 Jul 1934.
- Doctor of Letters from Bowdoin University, Brunswick, Maine, in 1935.
- Doctor of Humane Letters from Fordham University, New York, in 1940.
- Doctor of Letters from Harvard University, Massachusetts, on 11 Jun 1942.

== Medals awarded ==
- Cervantes Medal from the Hispanic Society of America Medal, 3 times, the first in 1907.
- Sigillum Academiæ Harvardianæ in Nov Ang, at the Harvard University Quindecennial, in 1909.
- Medalla de Oro en Homenaje a Menéndez y Pelayo, from La Real Academia de la Historia, Madrid, Spain, in 1910.
- Caballero, La Real Orden Isabel la Católica, from Spain, in 1922.
- Chevalier de l'Ordre National de la Légion d'Honneur de France, in 1922.
- Croce di Cavaliere dell'Ordine della Corona d'Italia, before 1924.
- Officier de l'Ordre National de la Légion d'Honneur de France, in 1927.
- Order of Public Instruction, by Portugal, in 1930.
- Émile Legouis Medal, in 1932.
- Knight, Royal Order of Cultural Merit of Romania, in 1933.
- Sigillum Academiæ Harvardianæ in Nov Ang, from Harvard University, in 1936.
- Laetare Medal from Notre Dame University, in Notre Dame, Indiana, on 6 June 1937.
- Medalla Conmemorativa Cervantes from El Instituto de las Españas en los Estados Unidos, Seccion de Florida, in 1951.
- Chevalier, l'Ordre des Arts et des Lettres, from Republique Française.
- Delegate's Ribbon from l'Académie des Inscriptions et Belles-Lettres, Paris, France.
- Comendador, La Real Orden Isabel la Católica, from Spain.
- Jacques Cartier Medal, from France.
- La Câmara de Comércio de Boston Medal, from the Republic of Bolivia.
- Lafayette Medal.
- Medalha de Honra da Cidade de Lisboa, Portugal. Received twice.
- Medalion Per L'Italia, Ora E Sempre.
- Prin Culturä La Libertate Medal with button, from Romania.
- Université de Paris Medal, Paris, France.

== Founder ==
- Catholic Club of Harvard University, in May 1893.
- Medieval Academy of America, in 1925.
- Harvard Council on Hispano-American Studies, in 1929.

== President ==
- Dante Society of America, Massachusetts, from 1927 to 1940.
- Italian Historical Society of Massachusetts, from 1930 to 1940.
- American Academy of Arts & Sciences, from 1931 to 1933.
- The Cambridge Club, Cambridge, Massachusetts, in 1933. Membership is limited to 100.
- American Catholic Historical Association, in 1935.
- Medieval Academy of America, from 1939 to 1942.
- Humanities Research Association of England, in 1937.

== Vice-President ==
- Modern Language Association of America, from 1910 to 1911.
- Hispanic Society of America, in 1917.
- Modern Language Association of America, from 1927 to 1928.
- American Academy of Arts & Sciences, from 1930 to 1931.
- Hispanic Society of America, from 1937.

== Elected ==
- Corresponding Member of Hispanic Society of America in 1907.
- Correspondiente de la Real Academia Española, in 1911.
- Cambridge School Board member in Cambridge, Massachusetts from 1915 to 1916.
- Correspondiente de la Real Academia de Buenas Letras de Barcelona, Spain, in 1913.
- Fellow of the American Academy of Arts & Sciences, before 1919.
- Fellow of the Medieval Academy of America, in 1927.
- Membre Correspondant de l'Académie des Inscriptions et Belles-Lettres de l'Institut de France, in 1944.

== Memberships ==
- The Colonial Club of Cambridge, Massachusetts.
- Charter member of the American Association of University Professors.
- Council of the Dante Society.
- American Folk-Lore Society.
- American Council of Learned Societies.
- Executive Committee of the Medieval Academy of America.
- American Association of Teachers of Spanish.
- Council of the American Association of University Professors.
- American Dialect Society.
- Cercle de la Renaissance Française.
- Club of Odd Volumes.
- Editorial Board of the Hispanic Review.
- Harvard University Standing Committee: Requirements for a Degree with Distinction in History & Literature.
- Société Amicale Gaston.
- Société de Linguistique.
- Société des Anciens Textes Français.

== Other ==
- Italian & Spanish Editor of the New International Encyclopedia, from 1901 to 1904.
- Chief Examiner in Spanish for the College Entrance Examination Board, from 1908 to 1921.
- In charge of Spanish & French acquisitions for Harvard University, after 1916.
- First Editor-in-Chief of Speculum, the journal of the Medieval Academy of America, from 1927 to 1936.
- Editor-in-Chief of the Henry Holt & Co. Spanish Series.
- Consulting editor of Hispania, the official journal of the American Association of Teachers of Spanish & Portuguese.

== Bibliography ==
This is a select list of publications by Ford.

=== 1899 ===
- Un Curioso Accidente, Comedia In Tre Acti, di Carlo Goldoni, edited with introductions & notes by J.D.M. Ford. Boston: Heath's Modern Language Series, 1899. 29 editions.
- Exercises in Spanish Composition for First and Second Year Courses, J.D.M. Ford. Boston: Heath's Modern Language Series, 1899, reprinted 1905, 1908.
- El Sí de las Niňas; Comedia en Tres Actos y en Prosa por Leandro Fernández de Moratín, edited with introductions and notes by J.D.M.Ford. Boston: International Modern Language Series 1899, reprinted Boston: Ginn & Co.,1916. 194 editions.
- “Luis de León, the Spanish Poet, Humanist and Mystic,” by J.D.M. Ford. Publications of the Modern Language Association. XIV: 2 (1899), pp. 267–278.
- “Sedere, Essere, and Stare in the Poema del Cid”, by J.D.M. Ford. Modern Language Notes XIV: 2 (1899), pp. 1–9.

=== 1900 ===
- The Old Spanish Sibilants, by J.D.M. Ford. Harvard Studies and Notes in Philology and Literature VII. Boston: Ginn & Co., 1900. 2 editions.
- “Uberti, Fazio,” by J.D.M. Ford. The Universal Cyclopaedia. II: 17. New York: D. Appleton & Co., 1900.
- “Ulloa y Pereira,” by J.D.M. Ford. The Universal Cyclopaedia. II: 20. New York: D. Appleton & Co., 1900.
- “Valdivierso or Valdivielso, José de,” by J.D.M. Ford. The Universal Cyclopaedia. II: 104. New York: D. Appleton & Co., 1900.
- “Vallanccy, Charles,” by J.D.M. Ford. The Universal Cyclopaedia. II: 108. New York: D. Appleton & Co., 1900.
- “Varchi, Benedetto,” by J.D.M. Ford. The Universal Cyclopaedia. II: 122. New York: D. Appleton & Co., 1900.
- “Venturi, Luigi,” by J.D.M. Ford. The Universal Cyclopaedia. II: 154. New York: D. Appleton & Co., 1900.
- “Villalobos, Francisco Lopez, Joaquin Lorenzo” by J.D.M. Ford. The Universal Cyclopaedia. XII: 200. New York: D. Appleton & Co., 1900.
- “Villanueva, Joaquin Lorenzo” by J.D.M. Ford. The Universal Cyclopaedia. XII: 200. New York:D. Appleton & Co., 1900.
- “Villegas, Esteran Manuel de” by J.D.M. Ford. The Universal Cyclopaedia. XII: 201. New York: D. Appleton & Co., 1900.
- “Villena Don Enrique de Aragón” by J.D.M. Ford. The Universal Cyclopaedia. XII: 202. New York: D. Appleton & Co., 1900.
- “Wolf, Ferdinand” by J.D.M. Ford. The Universal Cyclopaedia. XII: 496. New York: D. Appleton & Co., 1900.

=== 1900–1909 ===
- A Spanish Anthology: A Collection of Lyrics from the Thirteenth Century down to the Present Time; edited with introductions and notes by J.D.M. Ford. New York: Silver Series of Modern Language Text-books, 1901, 4 editions.
- "English Influence upon Spanish Literature in the Early Part of the Nineteenth Century,” by J.D.M. Ford. P.M.L.A. XVI (1901), pp. 453–459.
- “Cuban Literature” by J.D.M.Ford. The New International Encyclopedia. 1902.
- “Italian Literature” by J.D.M.Ford. The New International Encyclopedia. 1902.
- “Leopardi” by J.D.M. Ford. The New International Encyclopedia. 1902.
- “Portuguese Literature” by J.D.M.Ford. The New International Encyclopedia. 1902.
- “Petrarch” by J.D.M. Ford. The New International Encyclopedia. 1902.
- “Spanish Literature” by J.D.M.Ford. The New International Encyclopedia.1902.
- Review of R. Menendez Pidal, La Legenda del Abad Don Juan de Montemayor, by J.D.M. Ford, Dresden: Gesellschaft fur Romantische Literatus, BandII, 1903.
- “Old Spanish Etymologies,” by J.D.M. Ford. Modern Philology I: 1, (June 1903), p. 49-55.
- The Romances of Chivalry in Italian Verse, by J.D.M. Ford and Mary Agnes Teresa Ford. New York: Henry Holt & Co., 1904, 1906, 1908.
- A Spanish Grammar, by E.C. Hills and J.D.M. Ford. Boston: Heath's Modern Language Series, 1904.
- “To Bite the Dust and Symbolical Lay Communion,” by J.D.M. Ford. Publications of the Modern Language Association. XX (XIII), 2, (1905), 197-230.
- Old Spanish Readings, Selected on the Basis of Critically Edited Texts, by J.D.M. Ford. Boston: International Modern Language Series, 1906.
- “Italian Language,” by J.D.M. Ford. The New International Encyclopedia, Vol. 11: 16-18. New York: Dodd, Mead & Co, 1906.
- “Italian Literature,” by J.D.M. Ford. The New International Encyclopedia, Vol. 11: 18-27. New York: Dodd, Mead & Co, 1906.
- Selections from Don Quijote by Miguel de Cervantes Saaverda, J.D.M. Ford, ed. Boston: D.C. Heath & Co. 1908. 1125 Editions.
- "Caldas-Barbosa, Domingos,” by J.D.M. Ford. The Catholic Encyclopedia, Vol. 3:155-6. New York: Robert Appleton Co., 1908.
- "Calderon de la Barca, Pedro,” by J.D.M. Ford. The Catholic Encyclopedia, Vol. 3:156-7. New York: Robert Appleton Co., 1908.
- "Camões, Luis Vaz de,” by J.D.M. Ford. The Catholic Encyclopedia, Vol. 3:218-20. New York: Robert Appleton Co., 1908.
- "Capponi, Gino, Count” by J.D.M. Ford. The Catholic Encyclopedia, Vol. 3:312. New York: Robert Appleton Co., 1908.
- "Cervantes, Saavedra Miguel de,” by J.D.M. Ford. The Catholic Encyclopedia, Vol. 3:543-45. New York: Robert Appleton Co., 1908.
- "Ferreira, Antonio,” by J.D.M. Ford. The Catholic Encyclopedia, Vol. 6: 49. New York: Robert Appleton Co., 1909.
- “Folengo, Teofilo,” by J.D.M. Ford. The Catholic Encyclopedia, Vol. 6:124. New York: Robert Appleton Co., 1909.
- “Gallego, Juan Nicasio,” by J.D.M. Ford. The Catholic Encyclopedia, Vol. 6:350. New York: Robert Appleton Co., 1909.
- “Garcilasso de la Vega,” by J.D.M. Ford. The Catholic Encyclopedia, Vol. 6:381-2. New York: Robert Appleton Co., 1909.
- “Giraldi, Giovanni Battista,” by J.D.M. Ford. The Catholic Encyclopedia, Vol. 6:568. New York: Robert Appleton Co., 1909
- “Giusti, Giuseppe,” by J.D.M. Ford. The Catholic Encyclopedia, Vol. 6:574. New York: Robert Appleton Co., 1909.
- “Goldoni, Carlo,” by J.D.M. Ford. The Catholic Encyclopedia, Vol. 6: 631. New York: Robert Appleton Co., 1909.
- “Gomes De Amorim, Francisco,” by J.D.M. Ford. The Catholic Encyclopedia, Vol. 6:632-3. New York: Robert Appleton Co., 1909.
- “Gonzalo de Berceo,” by J.D.M. Ford. The Catholic Encyclopedia, Vol. 6:636. New York: Robert Appleton Co., 1909.
- “Gozzi. Carlo,” by J.D.M. Ford. The Catholic Encyclopedia, Vol. 6: 688. New York: Robert Appleton Co., 1909.
- “Italian Language,” by J.D.M. Ford. The New International Encyclopedia, Vol. 11: 16-18. New York: Dodd, Mead & Co, 1909.
- “Italian Literature,” by J.D.M. Ford. The New International Encyclopedia, Vol. 11: 18-27. New York: Dodd, Mead & Co, 1909.

=== 1910−1919 ===
- Review of La Difinita Pleiteada, Estudio de Literatura Comparative por Menendez Pidal; by J.D.M. Ford. Romanic Review I: 4, (October –December 1910).
- “Dante Purgatorio XIII, 49ff.,” by J.D.M. Ford. NY: Romanic Review I:2, (April – June 1910), p. 208-9.
- “Guzmán, Fernando Pérez de,” by J.D.M. Ford. The Catholic Encyclopedia, Vol. 7:94. New York: Robert Appleton Co., 1910.
- “Herculano de Carvalho e Araujo, Alejandro,” by J.D.M. Ford. The Catholic Encyclopedia, Vol.7:251. New York: Robert Appleton Co., 1910.
- “Herrera, Fernando de,” by J.D.M. Ford. The Catholic Encyclopedia, Vol. 7:294-5. New York: Robert Appleton Co., 1910.
- "Iglesias de la Casa, José,” by J.D.M. Ford. The Catholic Encyclopedia, Vol. 7:639. New York: Robert Appleton Co., 1910.
- “Jáurengui, Juan de,” by J.D.M. Ford. The Catholic Encyclopedia, Vol. 8:325-6. New York: Robert Appleton Co., 1910.
- “Jovellanos, Gaspar Melchor de,” by J.D.M. Ford. The Catholic Encyclopedia, Vol. 8:529. New York: Robert Appleton Co., 1910.
- “Lope de Vega Carpio, Félix,” by J.D.M. Ford. The Catholic Encyclopedia, Vol. 9:354-5. New York: Robert Appleton Co., 1910.
- “March, Auzias,” by J.D.M. Ford. The Catholic Encyclopedia, Vol. 9642. New York: Robert Appleton Co., 1910.
- “Marenco, Carlo and Leopold,” by J.D.M. Ford. The Catholic Encyclopedia, Vol. 9:651-2. New York: Robert Appleton Co., 1910.
- “Petrarch, Francesco,” by J.D.M. Ford. The Catholic Encyclopedia, Vol. 11:778-780. New York: Robert Appleton Co., 1910.
- Old Spanish Readings, Selected on the Basis of Critically Edited Texts; edited with introduction, notes and vocabulary by J.D.M. Ford. Boston:International Modern Language Series,1911. 7 editions.
- Selections from Don Quijote, edited by J.D.M. Ford. Boston: D.C. Heath, 1911.
- “Galdós: Nobel Prize Candidate,” Boston Transcript, 11 Dec 1911.
- “Mena, Juan de,” by J.D.M. Ford. The Catholic Encyclopedia, Vol. 10:171. New York: Robert Appleton Co., 1911.
- "Menzini, Benedetto,” by J.D.M. Ford. The Catholic Encyclopedia, Vol. 10:196. New York: Robert Appleton Co., 1911.
- “Metastasio, Pietro,” by J.D.M. Ford. The Catholic Encyclopedia, Vol. 10::234. New York: Robert Appleton Co., 1911.
- "Morales, Ambrosio,” by J.D.M. Ford. The Catholic Encyclopedia, Vol. 10:556-7. New York: Robert Appleton Co., 1911.
- "Ojeda, Alonso de,” by J.D.M. Ford. The Catholic Encyclopedia, Vol. 11:230. New York: Robert Appleton Co., 1911.
- "Parini, Giuseppi,” by J.D.M. Ford. The Catholic Encyclopedia, Vol. 11:480. New York: Robert Appleton Co., 1911.
- "Pellico, Silvio,” by J.D.M. Ford. The Catholic Encyclopedia, Vol. 11:609. New York: Robert Appleton Co., 1911.
- “Pindemonte, Ippolito,” by J.D.M. Ford. The Catholic Encyclopedia, Vol. 12:101. New York: Robert Appleton Co., 1911.
- "Porta, Carlo,” by J.D.M. Ford. The Catholic Encyclopedia, Vol. 12:283. New York: Robert Appleton Co., 1911
- "Pulci, Luigi,” by J.D.M. Ford. The Catholic Encyclopedia, Vol. 12:562. New York: Robert Appleton Co., 1911.
- "Redi, Francesco,” by J.D.M. Ford. The Catholic Encyclopedia, Vol. 12:687. New York: Robert Appleton Co., 1911.
- "Rodrigues Ferreira, Alexandre,” by J.D.M. Ford. The Catholic Encyclopedia, Vol. 13:109. New York: Robert Appleton Co., 1912.
- "Selgas y Carrasco, José,” by J.D.M. Ford. The Catholic Encyclopedia, Vol. 13:691-2. New York: Robert Appleton Co., 1912.
- “Tassoni, Alessandro,” by J.D.M. Ford. The Catholic Encyclopedia, Vol. 14:464. New York: Robert Appleton Co., 1912.
- "Tebaldeo, Antonio,” by J.D.M. Ford. The Catholic Encyclopedia, Vol. 14:468. New York: Robert Appleton Co., 1912.
- “Tiraboschi, Girolamo,” by J.D.M. Ford. The Catholic Encyclopedia, Vol. 14:738. New York: Robert Appleton Co., 1909.
- "Trissino, Giangiorgio,” by J.D.M. Ford. The Catholic Encyclopedia, Vol. 15:61. New York: Robert Appleton Company, 1912.
- "Trueba, Antonio de,” by J.D.M. Ford. The Catholic Encyclopedia, Vol. 15: 70. New York: Robert Appleton Co., 1912.
- “Verdaguer, Jacinto,” by J.D.M. Ford. The Catholic Encyclopedia, Vol.15. New York: Robert Appleton Co., 1912.
- "Vicente, Gil,” by J.D.M. Ford. The Catholic Encyclopedia, Vol.15. New York: Robert Appleton Co., 1912.
- “Spain,” by J.D.M. Ford. The Catholic Encyclopedia, Vol. 14: 169-202. New York: Robert Appleton Co., 1912.
- “Spanish-American Literature,” by J.D.M. Ford. The Catholic Encyclopedia, Vol. 14:202-7. New York: Robert Appleton Co., 1912.
- “Spanish Language and Literature,” by J.D.M. Ford. The Catholic Encyclopedia, Vol. 14:192-202. New York: Robert Appleton Co., 1912.
- “Diplomacy Below the Equator,” by J.D.M. Ford. Boston Transcript, August 12, 1913.
- “Possible Foreign Sources of the Spanish Novel of Roguery,” by J.D.M. Ford. Anniversary Papers by Colleagues and Pupils of George Lyman Kittredge. Boston: Ginn and Co., 1913, pp. 289–293.
- "Cervantes,” by J.D.M. Ford. Lectures on the Harvard Classics, Ed. William Allan Neilson, et al. Vol 51: 238-42. The Harvard Classics. New York: P.F. Collier & Son, 1909–14.
- "Manzoni,” by J.D.M. Ford. Lectures on the Harvard Classics, Ed. William Allan Neilson, et al. Vol 51: 243-7. The Harvard Classics. New York: P.F. Collier & Son, 1909–14.
- A Spanish Grammar with Alternative Exercises; by E.C. Hills and J.D.M. Ford. Boston: D.C. Heath & Co., 1915.
- First Spanish Course; by E.C. Hills and J.D.M. Ford. Boston: D.C. Heath & Co., 1917. 10 editions.
- “El Sombrero de Tres Picos (The Cocked Hat),” by J.D.M. Ford. The Encyclopedia Americana. XII: 46-7. New York: Encyclopedia Americana, 1918.
- “Fábulas of Tomás de Iriarte,” by J.D.M. Ford. The Encyclopedia Americana. XII: 696-7. New York: Encyclopedia Americana, 1918.
- Spanish Fables in Verse, edited with introductions and vocabulary by Elizabeth C. and J.D.M. Ford. Boston: Heath's Modern Language Series, 1918.
- “The Teaching of Spanish and our Spanish-American Interests,” Abstract of report made by J.D.M. Ford to the American Association of University Professors and to the Modern Language Association of America. Studies in Philology XV, 1 (January, 1918), p. 65-67.
- “Guzmán el Bueno,” by J.D.M. Ford. The Encyclopedia Americana. XIII: 585-6. New York: Encyclopedia Americana, 1919.
- “José” by J.D.M. Ford. The Encyclopedia Americana. XVI: 210-11. New York: Encyclopedia Americana, 1919.
- “La Barraca” by J.D.M. Ford. The Encyclopedia Americana. XVI: 567. New York: Encyclopedia Americana, 1919.
- “La Victoria de Junín” by J.D.M. Ford. The Encyclopedia Americana. XVI: 585-6. New York: Encyclopedia American, 1919.
- Main Currents in Spanish Literature; by J.D.M. Ford. New York: Henry Holt & Co., 1919. 8 editions.

=== 1920−1929 ===
- “Spanish Language” by J.D.M. Ford. The Encyclopedia Americana. XXV: 349-351. New York: Encyclopedia Americana, 1920.
- “Spanish Literature” by J.D.M. Ford. The Encyclopedia Americana. XXV: 353-8. New York: Encyclopedia Americana, 1920.
- “Hispanic America,” a lecture by J.D.M. Ford in New Lecture Hall, March 26, in aid of the Endowment Fund for Radcliffe College, Harvard Alumni Bulletin, 10 May 1923, pp. 909–920.
- “Some Consideration on Diphthongs and Triphthongs,” by J.D.M. Ford. Homenajea Menendez Pidal II. Madrid: Revista de la Universidad de Madrid, 1924, pp. 29–33.
- A Portuguese Grammar, by E.C.Hills, J.D.M. Ford, and Joaquim de Siquiera Coutinho. Boston: Heath's Modern Language Series, 1925. 6 editions.
- Review of CH. Petit-Dutaillis, ed., Fragmentde l’Histoire de Philippe-Auguste, Roy de France: Chronique en Français des Années 1214–1216; by J.D.M. Ford. Bibliothèque del’École des Chartres LXXXVII, 1926. Reprinted in Speculum (1926), pp. 353–354.
- Review of William J. Entwistle, The Arthurian Legend in the History of the Spanish Peninsula, by J.D.M. Ford, Bulletin of Hispanic Studies III (1926), pp. 141–2.
- Review of T. Atkinson Jenkins, La Chanson de Roland, Oxford Version, Edition, Notes and Glossary, by J.D.M.Ford, Speculum II: 1 (Jan 1927), pp. 92–104.
- “The Passage of Vulgar Latin Close Ų to French Rounded I (Ü, Y) is Purely a Romance Phenomenon,” by J.D.M. Ford. Extrait des Mèlanges de Philologie et d'histoire offerts à M. Antoine Thomas. Paris: Librairie Ancienne Honoré Champion, 1927.
- El Capitán Veneno, por D. PedroAntonio de Alcarón, edited with notes, exercises and vocabulary by J.D.M.Ford and Guillermo Rivera. Boston: Heath's Modern Language Series, 1927. 102 editions.
- “Plot, Tale and Episode in Don Quixote”; by J.D.M. Ford. Extraitdes Mélanges de linguistique et de literature offerts à M. Alfred Jeanroy parses élèves et ses amis. Paris: E. Droz. 1928.
- A Spanish Grammar for Colleges; by E.C. Hills and J.D.M.Ford. Boston: Heath's Modern Language Series, 1928.

=== 1930−39 ===
- A Tentative Bibliography of Brazilian Belles-Lettres; by J.D.M. Ford, Arthur P. Whitten and Maxwell L. Raphael. Cambridge: Harvard Univ. Press,1931. (Harvard Council of Hispano-American Studies VI.)
- Letters of John III, King of Portugal, 1521–1557. The Portuguese text, edited with an introduction by J.D.M. Ford. Cambridge: Harvard Univ. Press, 1931.
- Cervantes: A Tentative Bibliography of his Works and of the Biographical Material concerning him; by J.D.M. Ford and Ruth Lansing. Cambridge: Harvard Univ. Press, 1931. 3 editions.
- “The Saints Life in the Vernacular Literature of the Middle Ages”, by J.D.M. Ford. Catholic Historical Review, XVII: 3, reprinted October 1931.
- Letters of the Court of John III, King of Portugal. The Portuguese text, edited with an introduction by J.D.M. Ford. Cambridge: Harvard Univ. Press, 1933. 3 editions.
- A Bibliography of Cuban Belles-Lettres; by J.D.M. Ford & Maxwell I. Raphael. Cambridge: Harvard Univ. Press, 1933. (Harvard Council of Hispano-American Studies) 2 editions.
- A Tentative Bibliography of Paraguayan Belles-Lettres; by Maxwell L. Raphael & J.D.M. Ford. Cambridge: Harvard Univ. Press, 1934. (Harvard Council of Hispano-American Studies)
- “In Memoriam Henry Roseman Lang,” by J.D.M. Ford. Hispanic Review, III (1935), p. 70.
- “Sheldon, Edward Stevens,” by J.D.M. Ford. Dictionary of American Biography, XVII, pp. 64–65.
- “Ticknor, George,” by J.D.M. Ford, Dictionary of American Biography, XVIII, pp. 525–528.
- Crónica de Dom João de Castro; edited with an introduction by J.D.M. Ford. Cambridge: Harvard Univ. Press,1936. 2 editions.
- “The Ciceronian Dictum of History,”by J.D.M. Ford, Catholic Historical Review, XXI, 4, reprint 1936.
- “Harvard and La France,” by J.D.M. Ford, Harvard Alumni Bulletin, October 23, 1936.
- Brief Spanish Grammar for Colleges; by E.C. Hills, J.D.M. Ford and G. Rivera. Boston: Heath's Modern Language Series, 1938. 2 editions.
- “The First English Translator of the Lusíadas of Camões, Sir Richard Fanshawe,” by J.D.M. Ford. Modern Humanities Research Association, XVII (Sep 1938), pp. 6–23. (Reprinted in Harvard Alumni Bulletin, September 19, 1938)
- Review of Rodney Gallop, Portugal – A Book of Folkways, by J.D.M. Ford. Journal of American Folk-Lore, Vol. 51, No. 199 (Jan-Mar 1938), pp. 115–7.
- Bibliografí critic de ediciones del Quijote, impresas desde 1605 hasta 1917, recompiladas y descrites Juan Suñé Benages y Juan Suñé Fonbuena; continudas hasta 1937 por el primero de loscitados sutores y ahora redaciada por J.D.M. Ford y C.T. Keller. Cambridge: Harvard Univ. Press, 1939. (A Critical Bibliography of Editions of The Don Quixote Printed Between 1605 and 1917 by Benages and Fonbuena, continued to 1937 by....). 2 editions.

=== 1940−1950 ===
- The Lusiad, translated by SirRichard Fanshawe, edited with introduction by J.D.M. Ford. Cambridge: Harvard Univ. Press, 1940.
- “Some Principles of Linguistic Change in Romance,” by J.D.M.Ford. Speculum, Vol. 15, No 3 (Jul 1940), 384-5.
- New First Spanish Course, by E C Hills, J D M Ford. London: George G. Harrap, 1942. 4 editions.
- Portuguese Grammar; by Elijah Clarence Hills; J D M Ford; John de S Coutinho; revised by LG Moffat. Boston: Heath's Modern Language Series, 1944.
- “Hills, E. C.,” by J.D.M. Ford. Dictionary of American Biography, XXI, 405-6.
- “Lang, Henry,” by J.D.M. Ford. Dictionary of American Biography, XXI, 481-2.
- Os Lusíadas by Luis de Camões; edited with introduction and notes by J.D.M. Ford. Harvard Studies in Romance Languages XXIII. Cambridge: Harvard Univ. Press, 1946. 9 editions.
- “In Memoriam of Henry Lang,” by J.D.M. Ford. Hispanic Review I (1946), p. 70.
- “The Significance of the Cervantes Quadricentennial,” by J.D.M. Ford. Hispania, (Aug 1947), pp. 293–96.
- “George Ticknor,” by J. D. M.Ford. Hispania, Vol. 32, No. 4, (Nov1949), pp. 423–425.
- Review of La Política y la Reconquista en el Siglo XI (by RamónMenéndez Pidal), by J.D.M. Ford. Speculum, Vol. 24, No. 1 (Jan., 1949), pp. 132–133.
- “The Saint’s Life in the Middle Ages,” by J. D. M. Ford. The Catholic Historical Review, 17: 3(Oct 1931), pp. 268–9.

=== Other ===
- Classic Italian Poetry; edited by J. D. M. Ford. In press in winter 1903–1904.
- “The Novel,” by J. D. M. Ford.
- The Types of English Literature, Neilson, William Allen, ed., Boston: Houghton Mifflin Co., contracted 1907.

=== Articles to which he contributed ===
- Les Annales du Midi.
- România literară.
- Modern Philology.
- Publications of the Modern Language Association of America (PMLA)
- Modern Language Notes
- Romanic Review

=== Spanish and Italian article contributions ===
- The Catholic Encyclopedia
- The Dictionary of American Biography
- The Encyclopedia Americana
- Johnson's Encyclopedia
- The New International Encyclopedia
- The Universal Cyclopaedia
