= Chandler Rathfon Post =

American art historian

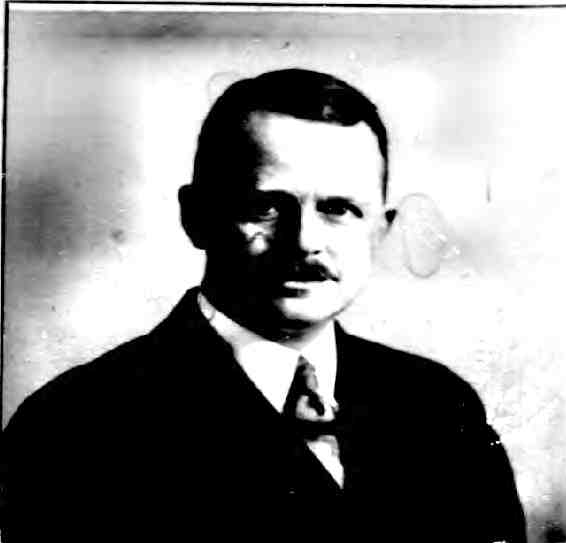
- Post, 1922
- Born: December 14, 1881; Detroit, Michigan, US
- Died: November 2, 1959 (aged 77); Foxborough, Massachusetts, US
- Other name: Chandler R. Post

Academic background
- Education: Harvard University
- Thesis: Castilian Allegory of the Fifteenth Century, with Especial Reference to the Influence of Dante (1909)
- Doctoral advisor: Jeremiah D. M. Ford

Academic work
- Discipline: Art history
- Institutions: Harvard University (1909–1950)
- Notable students: Walter William Spencer Cook

Chandler Rathfon Post (1881–1959) was an American art historian and professor. He was a professor emeritus at Harvard University (working from 1909 until 1950), focused as a historian of Spanish and Italian Renaissance art and iconography. Post authored the book series, A History of Spanish Painting.

== Biography ==
Post was born on December 14, 1881, in Detroit, Michigan, to parents Anne M. Rathfon and William R. Post.

Post attended Harvard University, his classmates included Franklin D. Roosevelt and Hayward Keniston, and graduated in 1904, with a B.A. degree in Spanish literature. After graduation he studied Greek literature at American School of Classical Studies in Athens, Greece. In 1909, Post received his Ph.D. from Harvard. His thesis was titled, Castillian Allegory of the Fifteenth Century, with Especial Reference to the Influence of Dante (1909), and his doctoral advisor was Jeremiah D. M. Ford.

In 1914, he started teaching at Harvard, first as assistant professor of Greek Art and Fine Arts. By 1934, he was appointed as the William Dorr Boardman professor of Fine Arts. Students of Post included John Dos Passos and Walter William Spencer Cook.

Post was a prolific author and researcher, he started his first visual survey series with, History of European and American Sculpture (1921), which was two volume and is one of the earliest American art surveys published. His survey series, A History of Spanish Painting (spanning publishing dates 1930–1953) was fourteen volumes in length and extensive in details. His last two books in the Spanish painting series were published posthumous by Harold Edwin Wethey.

Post was a member of both the American Academy of Arts and Sciences and the American Philosophical Society.

He died November 2, 1959, in Foxborough, Massachusetts.

== Publications ==
- Post, Chandler R. (1915). Mediaeval Spanish Allegory. Volume 4 of Harvard Studies in Comparative Literature. Cambridge, Massachusetts: Harvard University Press. ISBN 9783487401867.
- Post, Chandler R. (1921). A History of European and American Sculpture from the Early Christian Period to the Present Day, Volume 1. Vol. 1 (1 ed.). Cambridge, Massachusetts: Harvard University Press. ISBN 9780722229798.
- Post, Chandler R. (1921). A History of European and American Sculpture from the Early Christian Period to the Present Day, Volume 2. Vol. 2 (1 ed.). Cambridge, Massachusetts: Harvard University Press.
