= Walter William Spencer Cook =

American historian

- Born: April 7, 1888; Orange, Massachusetts, US
- Died: September 20, 1962 (aged 74)
- Other name: Walter W. S. Cook
- Known for: Spanish Medieval art history

Academic background
- Education: Harvard University (BA, MA, PhD)
- Thesis: Romanesque Panel Painting in Catalonia (1924)
- Doctoral advisor: Chandler Rathfon Post

Walter William Spencer Cook, also known as Walter W. S. Cook in citation (7 April 1888 – 20 September 1962) was an American art historian and professor. He specialized in Spanish Medieval art history. He was an emeritus professor from New York University (working from 1926 to 1956) and he helped found the New York University Institute of Fine Arts. He had a prominent role in introducing eminent German art historians to the United States.

== Early life and education ==
Walter William Spencer Cook was born on 7 April 1888 in Orange, Massachusetts, to parents Jan Macreal and William Jeremiah Cook. He attended Phillips Exeter Academy for high school, followed by studies at Harvard University. He received his B.A. degree in 1913, and M.A. degree in 1915 from Harvard and after he was a teaching assistant in the Fine Arts Department. From 1917 to 1919, he attended the American Expeditionary Force, during World War I.

From 1920 until 1921, Cook was a fellow in the Medieval and Renaissance Studies. Cook received his Ph.D. from Harvard University in 1924, his dissertation was titled, Romanesque Panel Painting in Catalonia (1924). His doctoral advisor was Chandler Rathfon Post.

== Career ==
In 1926, Cook joined New York University as faculty, and by 1932 he was made professor. By 1935, he was made a director of the graduate center and started recruiting eminent art history professors that were fleeing Germany (as Adolf Hitler's leadership was growing). Some of those recruited professors were in a visiting scholar or temporary appointment capacity, these included Erwin Panofsky, Walter Friedlaender, Karl Leo Heinrich Lehmann, Martin Weinberger, Adolph Goldschmidt, Otto Homburger, Marcel Aubert, Henri Focillon, Alfred Salmony, Rudolf Wittkower, Jurgis Baltrušaitis, Wolfgang Lotz, among others. Cook had many notable students, including Harry Bober, and Mildred Steinbach.

In 1950, Cook and José Gudiol Ricart issued Pintura e Imagineria Romanicas for the important Ars Hispaniae book series. Cook was one of only two English-speaking scholars author a volume in the set, and one of very few foreign authors.

Cook built up the photographic archive of Spanish manuscripts at the Frick Art Reference Library Photoarchive in New York City. In 1953, a special exhibition was held in his honor at The Cloisters in New York City.

Starting in 1936 he was a fellow of the Medieval Academy of America; from 1938 the president of the College Art Association, becoming the honorary director in 1947; he was awarded the Gold Order of Isabella la Catolica and the Medal of the Hispanic Society of America. In the 1940s, Cook served on the editorial board of Art in America magazine.

On 20 September 1962, he died at sea in the Atlantic Ocean, on the ocean liner Leonardo da Vinci returning home from Genoa.

== Publications ==
These are a select list of publications by Cook.

=== Books ===
- McComb, Arthur; Marquand, Allan; Cook, Walter W. S.; Smith, E. Baldwin; Clapp, Frederick Mortimer; Mather, Frank Jewett (1924). Art Studies: Medieval, Renaissance and Modern. Department of Fine Arts, Harvard University; Department of Fine Arts, Princeton University. Princeton University Press.
- Cook, Walter W. S. (1924). The Stucco Altar-Frontals of Catalonia. Department of Fine Arts, Harvard University; Department of Fine Arts, Princeton University. Princeton University Press.
- Cook, Walter W. S.; Gudiol Ricart, José (1950). Ars Hispaniae: Historia Universal del Arte Hispanico; Pintura e Imagineria Romanicas [Ars Hispaniae: Universal History of Hispanic Art, 6th Volume, Roman Painting and Imagery] (in Spanish). Vol. Sexto. Madrid, Spain: Editorial Plus Ultra.

=== Articles ===
- Cook, Walter W. S. (December 1953). "The Wooden Altar Frontal from Buira". The Art Bulletin. 35 (4): 299–300. doi:10.2307/3047509. JSTOR 3047509.
