= Patricia Barnett =

American librarian

- Born: 26 November 1942; Pittsburgh, Pennsylvania, United States
- Known for: librarian

Patricia J. Barnett (born 26 November 1942) served as the sixth Chief Librarian and second Andrew W. Mellon Chief Librarian of the Frick Art Reference Library.

== Career ==
In March 1970, Barnett began her career at The Metropolitan Museum of Art, New York. She served as the institution's Museum Librarian for Information Resources and the Director of the Clearinghouse on Art Documentation and Computerization, described as "a pre-Internet resource shared among the international archives, museum, and library information communities." She joined the staff of the Frick Art Reference Library in January 1995, becoming the second Andrew W. Mellon Chief Librarian. During her tenure, she oversaw the development and implementation of the online library catalog FRESCO (Frick Research Catalog Online) and the electronic conversion of the auction and book records. She was a co-founder of the New York Art Resources Consortium (NYARC), a collaboration of three leading art research institutions in New York City: the Frick Art Reference Library, the Brooklyn Museum Libraries & Archives, and The Museum of Modern Art Library. From 2000 to 2006, the Library hosted "Dialogues on Art," a series of annual panel discussions addressing issues of art-historical interest such as the art market, another project overseen by Barnett. She also spearheaded an exhibition program showcasing the institutions holdings. Finally, the Library's holdings dramatically increased under her direction. Among the major acquisitions were major photograph collections from Knoedler & Company, The Museum of Modern Art, and the Rijksbureau voor Kunsthistorische Documentatie and a valuable collection of eighteenth- and nineteenth-century auction catalogues sold by the Paris-based Heim Gallery Library in 2005. Since her retirement from the Frick Art Reference Library in 2008, she has worked as an independent consultant.
