= Mildred Steinbach =

Librarian

- Born: 22 December 1906; United States
- Died: 28 September 2002 (aged 95)
- Education: Vassar College, New York University
- Known for: Librarian

Mildred Steinbach (22 December 1906 – 28 September 2002) was an art historian and the fourth Chief Librarian of the Frick Art Reference Library.

== Education ==
Steinbach graduated from Vassar College, Poughkeepsie in 1929. She received a master's degree from the Institute of Fine Arts, New York University in 1946, completing a thesis on Spanish Romanesque sculpture under the direction of Walter W.S. Cook. While in graduate school, she worked as a librarian at the institute.

== Career ==
In 1944, Steinbach joined the Library's staff as a reference librarian. Three years later, she was promoted to Assistant Librarian, a position she held for twenty-three years. A specialist in medieval art, she was instrumental in augmenting the Photoarchive's collection of illuminated manuscripts. She served as the Chief Librarian of the Library from November 1970 to December 1977. During her tenure, more than 17,000 publications and 21,000 photographs were added to the Library's collections.

== Controversy ==
The Library maintained a strict dress code until 1989. Before that year, women "wearing very short skirts, slacks or spike heels" were not admitted, and men had to wear jackets or coats while conducting research in the Library's reading room. In 1975, the artist May Stevens challenged this regulation, issuing a formal complaint to New York City's Human Rights Commission. Steinbach defended the dress code, noting that "we think it's a nice kind of decorum. Usually we have a great deal of cooperation." She added that the ban on spike heels was to keep visitors from falling on the slippery marble floors.

== Publications ==
- "The Romanesque Sculpture of the Cathedral of Jaca" (1946). Unpublished M.A. thesis, New York University, Institute of Fine Arts
