= Frick Art Research Library =

Research library for Western art history

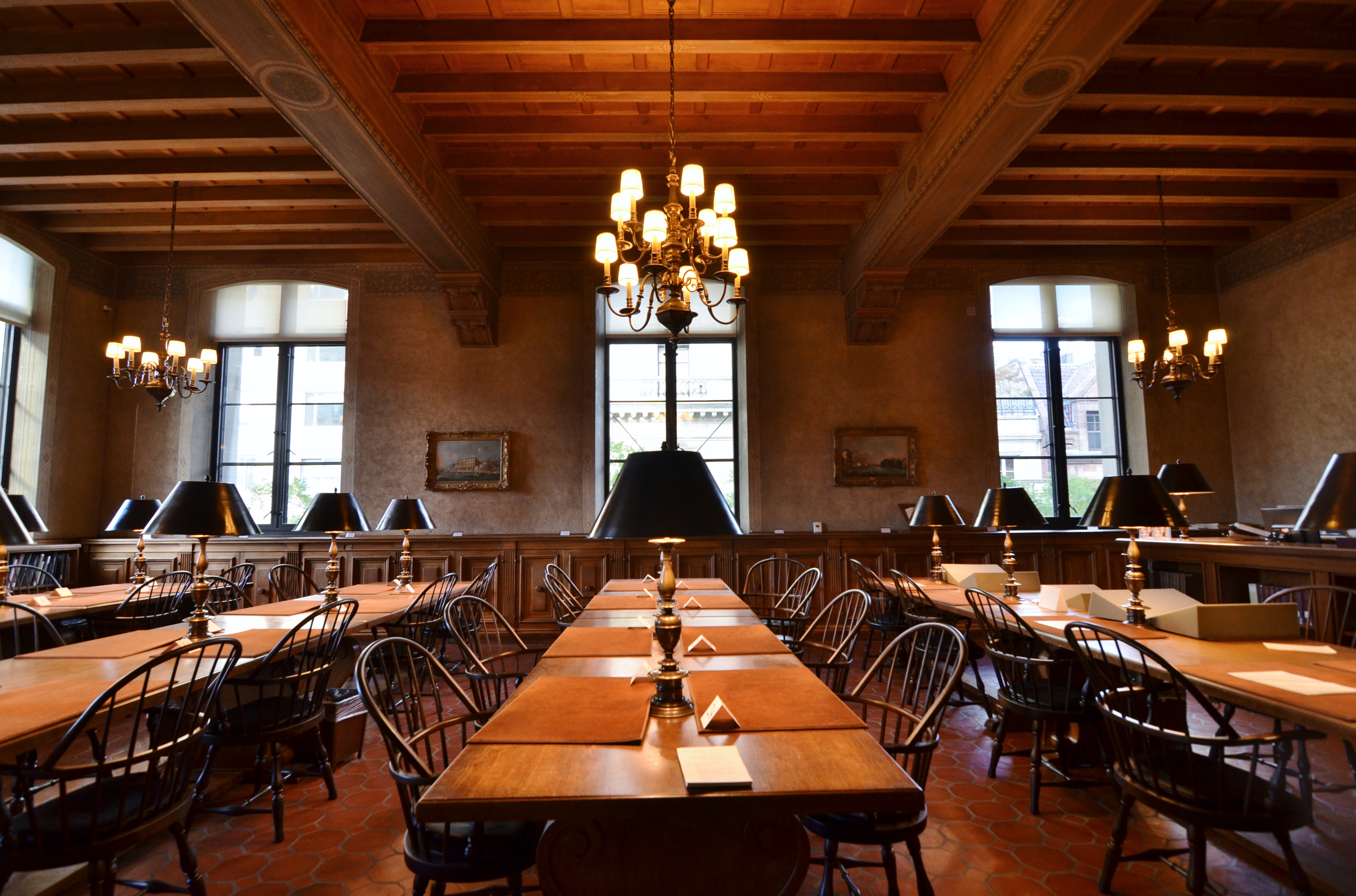
- Established: 1920
- Location: 10 East 71st Street, New York, NY 10021 (United States)
- Coordinates: 40.77118°N 73.96735°W
- Type: Library
- Directors: Axel Rüger (Anna-Maria and Stephen Kellen Director, The Frick Collection)
- Architect: John Russell Pope
- Website: http://www.frick.org/library

The Frick Art Research Library (formerly known as the Frick Art Reference Library) is the art library of the Frick Collection museum in Manhattan, New York City. The library, founded at the Henry Clay Frick House in 1920 by Helen Clay Frick, offers access to materials on the study of art to students, scholars, and the public. Its collection encompasses art from the fourth to the mid-twentieth century. It serves the greater art and art history research community—in person and online—and is a member of the New York Art Resources Consortium (which also includes the libraries of the Brooklyn Museum and the Museum of Modern Art).

== History ==
Helen Clay Frick founded the Frick Art Reference Library in 1920 as a memorial to her father, Henry Clay Frick, who had died in 1919. Its first home was the bowling alley of the Henry Clay Frick House; the library's staff worked in the house's basement. In 1924, the library was relocated from the bowling alley to a one-story building at 6 East 71st Street next to the Frick residence; the new structure was designed by the architecture firm of Carrère and Hastings. The library’s current building, at 10 East 71st Street, was designed by John Russell Pope and opened to the public January 14, 1935.

In 1943-1944, the Committee on the Protection of Cultural Treasures in War Areas—a branch of the Monuments, Fine Arts, and Archives Section unit, popularly known as the Monuments Men—headquartered at the library and prepared maps indicating historical sites and monuments for Allied troops to avoid during air strikes. The maps and documents were later used to help restitution efforts.

The Frick Art Reference Library formally merged with the Frick Collection in 1984.

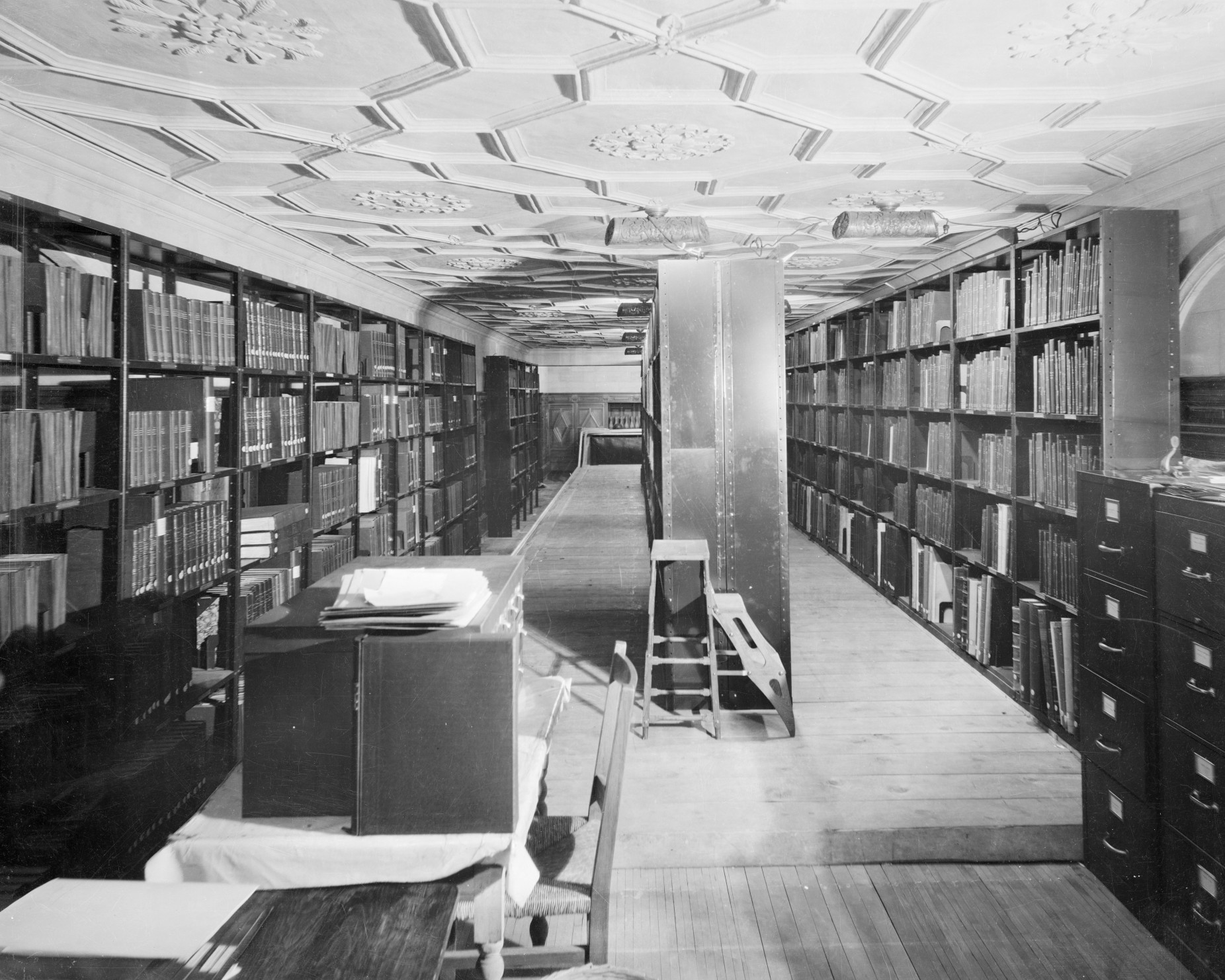
The Frick residence bowling alley housing the library, 1923.

From 2007 to 2021, the Center for the History of Collecting aimed to support the study of the formation of American and European public and private art collections from the Renaissance and colonial periods to the present day. It hosted lectures and symposia, offered fellowships, and awarded a biennial book prize. It created the online publication The Archives Directory for the History of Collecting, which the library continues to edit, augment, and host today. The program’s other publications include six volumes of the Pennsylvania State University Press series The Frick Collection Studies in the History of Art Collecting in America; two volumes in Brill’s Studies in the History of Collecting & Art Markets; and three publications with Centro de Estudios Europa Hispánica.

From 2020 to 2024, the library, along with the Frick Collection, relocated to Frick Madison (at 945 Madison Avenue) during the renovation of 1 East 70th Street and 10 East 71st Street. The library's reading room was renovated during this time. The library was renamed to the Frick Art Research Library in 2024 to better reflect its expanded mission and wealth of digital resources.

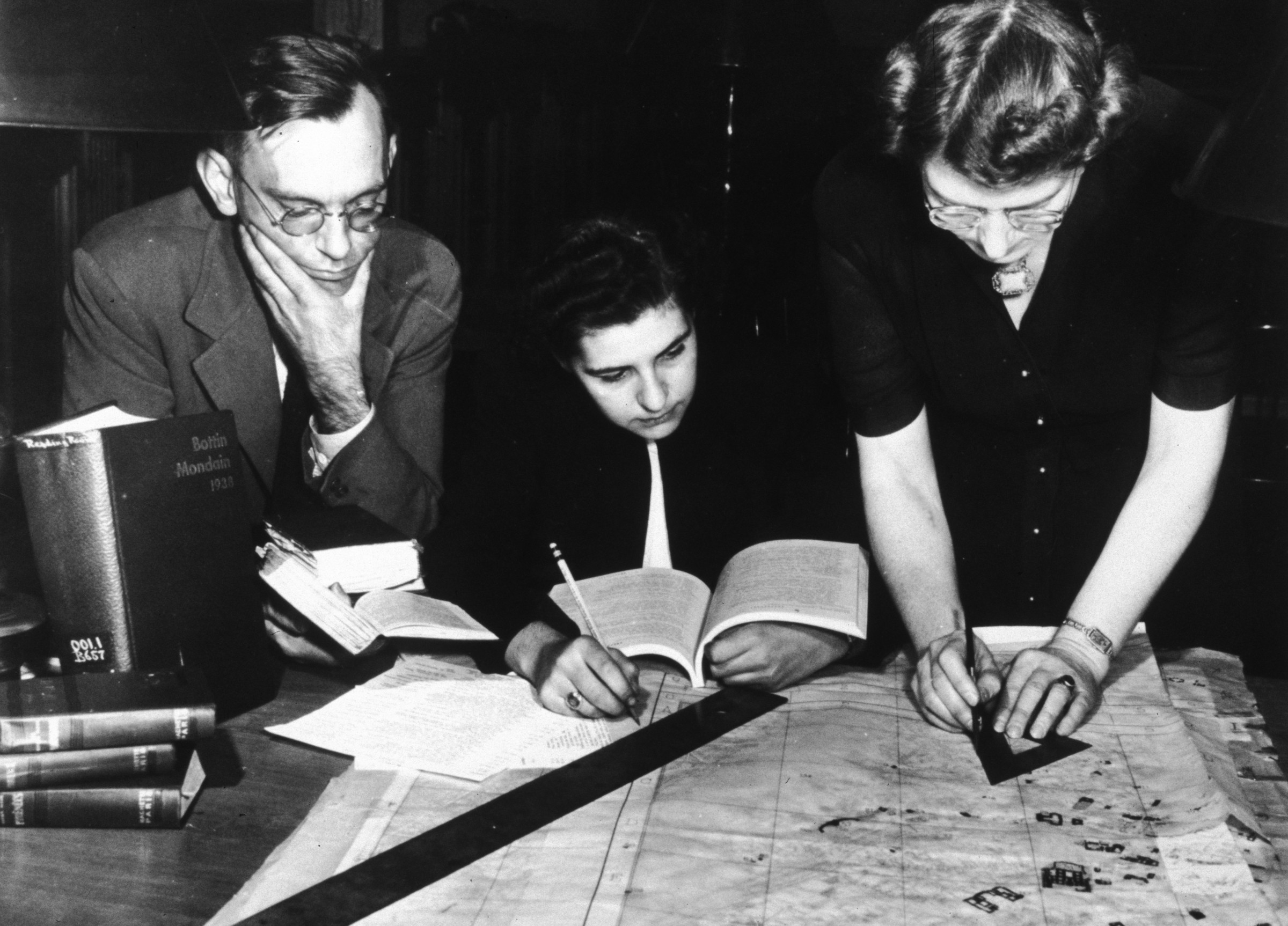
Members of the Committee on the Protection of Cultural Treasures in War Areas at the ACLS working at the Frick Art Reference Library, 1943-1944.

== Collections ==
The library holds a vast array of physical and digital art historical research materials. As of 2024, this includes 300,000 monographs; 3,300 periodical titles; and 100,000 auction catalogs from over 1,000 auction houses, dating from the seventeenth century to the present. In addition, the library offers access to electronic resources including art and image databases, e-books, e-journals, and a selection of websites. Around 25% of its collection is made up of “unique items”—items not held by any other library in WorldCat.

The Frick Art Periodicals Index, which indexes articles on western European and American art and artists, was started in 1923. The two indices—one in English, French, and Italian; the other in Eastern European languages—are fully digitized and available on EBSCO.

The Photoarchive was the library’s founding collection. It holds more than 1.5 million photographic reproductions of works of art from the fourth to the mid-twentieth century. The documentation it offers is continuously updated and records details on each work of art and its history. It contains works of art by over 40,000 artists.

The Archives department was established in 1997 under chief librarian Patricia Barnett. It encompasses the Frick Family Papers, the Frick’s institutional records, and manuscript collections such as photographs of artists and studios, gallery records, and art scholars’ papers.

=== Access and Services ===
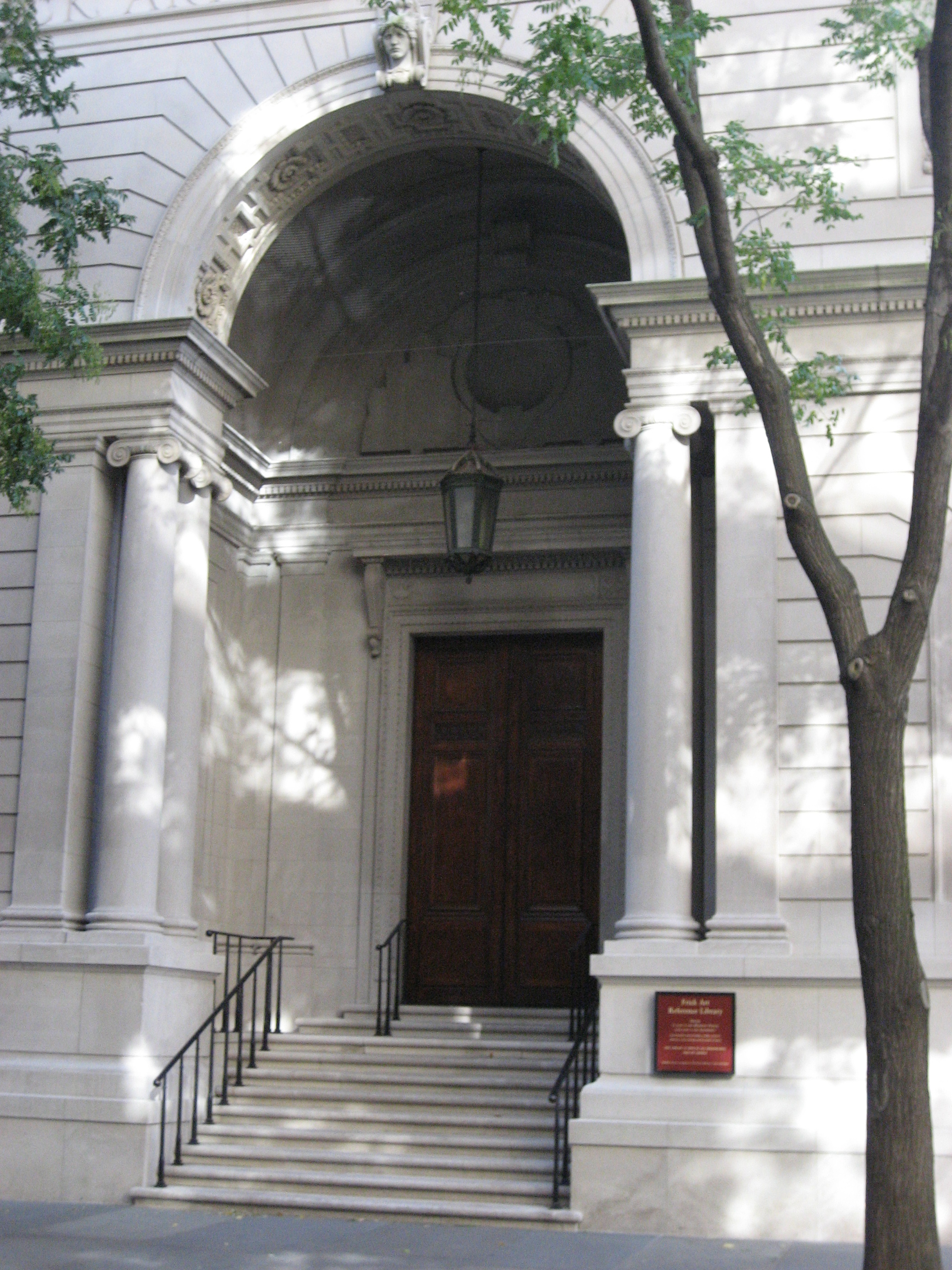
Entrance to the Library at 10 East 71st Street

The library is free to use for anyone 13 years of age or older with prior registration. All physical items in the collection can be requested in advance through the online catalog for consultation in the reading room and many items can be photographed or scanned. The library also offers interlibrary loan and document delivery services to registered researchers. Subscription databases are accessible onsite and many e-books are available remotely with a library account. In-person and virtual consultations are also available.

== Digital initiatives ==
Frick Digital Collections is the library’s active digital archive, accessible from anywhere. It includes scanned books, auction catalogs, Photoarchive images, and Archives collections. A portion of digitized materials is also available on Internet Archive.

The library formally initiated a collaborative web archiving program in January 2014, as a member of the New York Art Resources Consortium (NYARC). NYARC's web archive collections are developed and maintained in partnership with Archive-It, a subscription-based service of the Internet Archive. The NYARC consortium's web archiving program preserves at-risk websites across 10 public collections, such as those of New York City-based galleries, artists, auction houses, catalogues raisonnés, and art restitution research initiatives. The Frick Art Research Library/NYARC is also a founding member of the Collaborative ART Archive (CARTA). As of 2024, CARTA archives over 1,000 websites across 8 public collections related to art history and contemporary art practice.

The library’s Digital Art History program encourages exploration of new, interdisciplinary, and computational approaches to art historical research, creates tools, and publishes databases. Among its resources is the ARt Image Exploration Space (ARIES), an open-source, cloud-based browser application that allows users to create data visualizations and compare and manipulate digital images. ARIES was developed with New York University’s Tandon School of Engineering and the Universidade Federal Fluminense, Brazil. The Montias Database of Seventeenth Century Dutch Inventories contains information on nearly 1,300 inventories of goods and over 51,000 works of art owned in Amsterdam during the seventeenth century. Spanish Artists from the Fourth to the Twentieth Century: A Critical Dictionary, originally a four-volume print publication, provides essential bibliographic information on more than 5,000 Spanish artists. The Archives Directory for the History of Collecting in America is a guide to primary source materials related to dealers, collectors, and galleries active in the United States and where they are located. One of its features is a map search interface. The library freely shares its datasets on GitHub. Its public programs, including lectures and symposia, are archived online. More Digital Art History projects and resources, such as mapping the Photoarchive’s photography campaigns, are listed on the library’s Digital Initiatives page.

The Frick Photoarchive is a founding member of PHAROS, the International Consortium of Photo Archives. Its online platform, Artresearch.net, was launched in November 2025.

== List of chief librarians ==
The position of chief librarian has been known as the Andrew W. Mellon Chief Librarian since 1990. There have been eight chief librarians of the Frick Art Research Library:

- Luciano Johnson, 2026 to present
- Stephen J. Bury, 2010 to 2025
- Patricia Barnett, 1995 to 2008
- Helen Sanger, 1978 to 1994
- Mildred Steinbach, 1970 to 1977
- Hannah Johnson Howell, 1947 to 1970
- Ethelwyn Manning, 1924 to 1947
- Ruth Savord, 1920 to 1924
