= Florence Declaration =

The Florence Declaration – Recommendations for the Preservation of Analogue Photo Archives is an initiative of the Photo Library of the Kunsthistorisches Institut in Florenz.

== Background ==
With this Declaration, published in German, English, Italian, French and Polish, the aim of the Kunsthistorisches Institut is to foster understanding of the fundamental importance of analogue photos and photo archives for the future of the arts, humanities and social sciences. The Florence Declaration was presented on 31 October 2009 in the framework of the International Conference “Photo Archives and the Photographic Memory of Art History – Part II” (Kunsthistorisches Institut in Florenz, 29–31 October 2009). Since then the Declaration has received the backing and been subscribed by numerous international scholars.

== Content of the Declaration ==
Against the background of the ongoing debate on the complete digitization of photo archives and the frequent demands thus being made for the gradual winding up of photo archives and their conversion into digital and internet searchable forms, the Florence Declaration supports the view that, while the digitization of photographic collections is undoubtedly an aim worth pursuing, digital photos can only in part replace the original photographic print. Digital archives cannot therefore entirely take over the task of analogue archives. For technologies not only condition the methods of transmission, conservation and use of documents, but also shape their content. An analogue photo and its digital reproduction should therefore be considered two distinct objects. They each have different features. They cannot be interchanged. Since fields of research and topics of investigation in the human and social sciences have greatly changed in recent years, and analogue photography itself has increasingly become a focus of scholarly research, it is essential, according to the Florence Declaration, to overcome the traditional equivalence between analogue photographs and their digital reproduction.

=== Importance of analogue photos ===
In this context, a particular significance is attributed in the Florence Declaration to the character of analogue photos as material objects. Each analogue photo is thus said to possess a “biography” of its own that is expressed in various aspects such as the moment of its production, the technology used, the aim of its production, and its incorporation in the context of a particular archive and its system. Particular emphasis is placed on the tactile features of analogue photos, which are indispensable for their use in research and which are inevitably lost during the process of digital reproduction. The digital format is unable to reconstruct the “biography” of each photo in all its aspects and can only have a partial character. The combination of visual and material qualities with which an analogue photo is distinguished would, in the digitization process itself, be lost and its complexity inevitably reduced. Consequently, the idea of total accessibility connected to the digital format through databases would be illusory. While internet access is ideally independent of place and time, it also limits access to a single component of the photographic object: the digitalized image. Since digitization projects are necessarily bound up with a selection of particular aspects of the material, a wholly digitalized “capture” of the object with all its qualities would be impossible. The Florence Declaration further points out the inherent obsolescence and instability of the digital format itself: so far little reliable information is available on whether the long-term archiving of digital information is viable and how far online databases and internet structures can be maintained in the long run.

=== Archive ===
Research on photographs, moreover, is indissolubly bound up with the context of their conservation: the photo archive. Each photo archive is not just the sum of the single photographs preserved in it, but represents a unique and autonomous structure. For the human and social sciences it has the role of a laboratory: a place for the production and interpretation of knowledge. The physical context of an analogue photo library and the opportunities it opens up for research are fundamentally different from the conditions of a database that can be consulted online. In the view of the Florence Declaration it is therefore essential that the photo archive, not only as a tool, but also as an object of research, be preserved in all its structures and functions and that continuing access to it be guaranteed. For analogue archives are part of our cultural heritage, and in their overall structure can themselves become an important field for research. So the Florence Declaration and its subscribers appeal for the preservation of analogue photo libraries: digital libraries, they insist, ought not to replace but supplement them, so that scientific research and the tools for interpretation at the disposal of researchers be not limited, but expanded.
