= Richard Hamann =

German art historian (1879–1961)

Heinrich Richard Hamann (29 May 1879, in Seehausen – 9 January 1961, in Immenstadt im Allgäu) was a German art historian.

He attended the Kloster Unser Lieben Frauen in Magdeburg, and later studied Germanistics, art history and philosophy at the University of Berlin. In 1902 he received his promotion with the dissertation-thesis Das Symbol as a student of Wilhelm Dilthey. In 1911 he obtained his habilitation at Berlin, and subsequently became a professor of art history at Posen Academy. In 1913 he relocated to the University of Marburg, where he founded the Bildarchiv Foto Marburg (photo archives). From 1947 to 1957 he served as a guest professor at the University of Berlin.

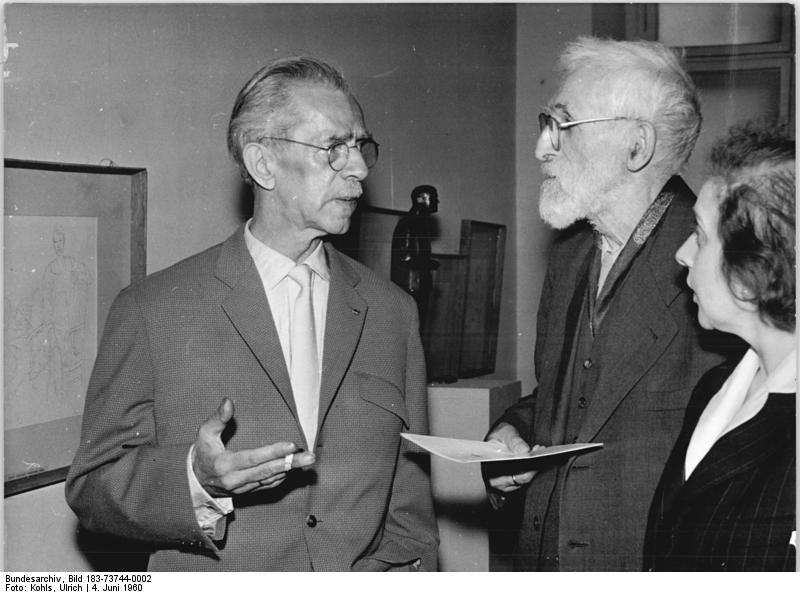
Otto Nagel (left) with Richard Hamann (1960)

Since 2009 the "Richard-Hamann-Preis für Kunstgeschichte" has been awarded for outstanding scientific achievements in the history of art or the promotion of art history research.

== Selected works ==
- Rembrandts Radirungen (1906) – Rembrandt's etchings.
- Der Impressionismus in Leben und Kunst (1907) – Impressionism in life and art.
- Die Frührenaissance der italienischen Malerei (1909) – Italian painting of the early Renaissance.
- Ästhetik (1911) – Aesthetics.
- Kunst und Kultur der Gegenwart (1922) – Art and culture of the present.
- Deutsche und französische Kunst im Mittelalter (1923) – German and French art of the Middle Ages.
- Die Skulpturen des Zeustempels zu Olympia (with Ernst Buschor, 1924) – The sculptures of the Temple of Zeus at Olympia.
- Die deutsche Malerei vom 18. bis zum Beginn des 20. Jahrhunderts (1925) – German painting from the 18th to the beginning of the 20th century.
- Geschichte der Kunst von der altchristlichen Zeit bis zur Gegenwart (1933) – History of art from the early Christian era to the present.
- Ägyptische Kunst; Wesen und Geschichte (1944) – Egyptian art; essence and history.
- Naturalismus (with Jost Hermand, 1959) – Naturalism.
- Impressionismus (with Jost Hermand, 1960) – Impressionism.
- Geschichte der Kunst (6 volumes, 1964) – History of art.
