= Frick Art Research Library Photoarchive =

Collection of photographic reproductions of art

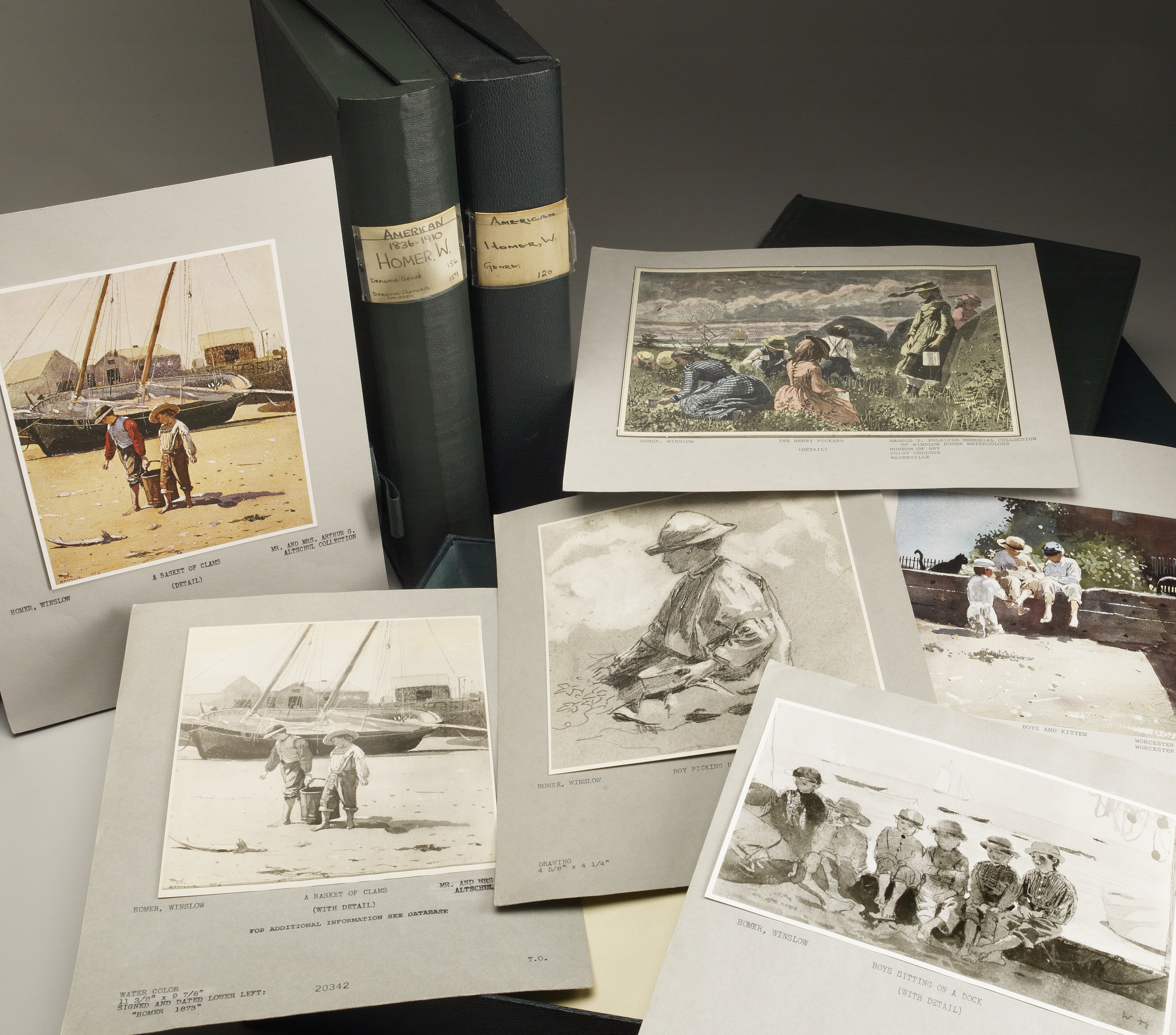
- Frick Art Reference Library Photoarchive materials
- Established: 1920
- Location: 10 East 71st Street, New York City, New York
- Coordinates: 40.77118°N 73.96735°W
- Type: Art Historical Photo Archive
- Website: www.frick.org/library/photoarchive

The Frick Art Research Library's Photoarchive in New York is a study collection of more than 1.5 million photographic reproductions of works of art from the fourth to the mid-twentieth century. It was founded in 1920 by Helen Clay Frick to facilitate object-oriented research. Alongside the reproductions, the extensive documentation it offers is continuously updated and records details on each work of art and its history, such as changes in ownership, attribution, and condition. It contains works of art by over 40,000 artists.

== History ==
The Photoarchive was the founding collection of the Frick Art Reference Library (renamed Frick Art Research Library in 2024). It was originally housed in the Frick mansion’s bowling alley. At the time of its inception, there was a growing body of art historical literature, but texts rarely included reproductions. Although many scholars had personal image libraries, the Frick Art Reference Library was one of the first institutions to afford public access to a centralized collection of photographic reproductions.

In planning the Photoarchive, Helen Clay Frick consulted with Sir Robert Witt and Mary Helene Witt, whose personal library of reproductions in London was her most important source of inspiration. She also turned to American and European art scholars, including Fiske Kimball and Bernard Berenson. For decades, the library acquired photographs through agents based in Europe such as Clotilde Brière-Mismé, Mario Sansoni, and Walter W.S. Cook.

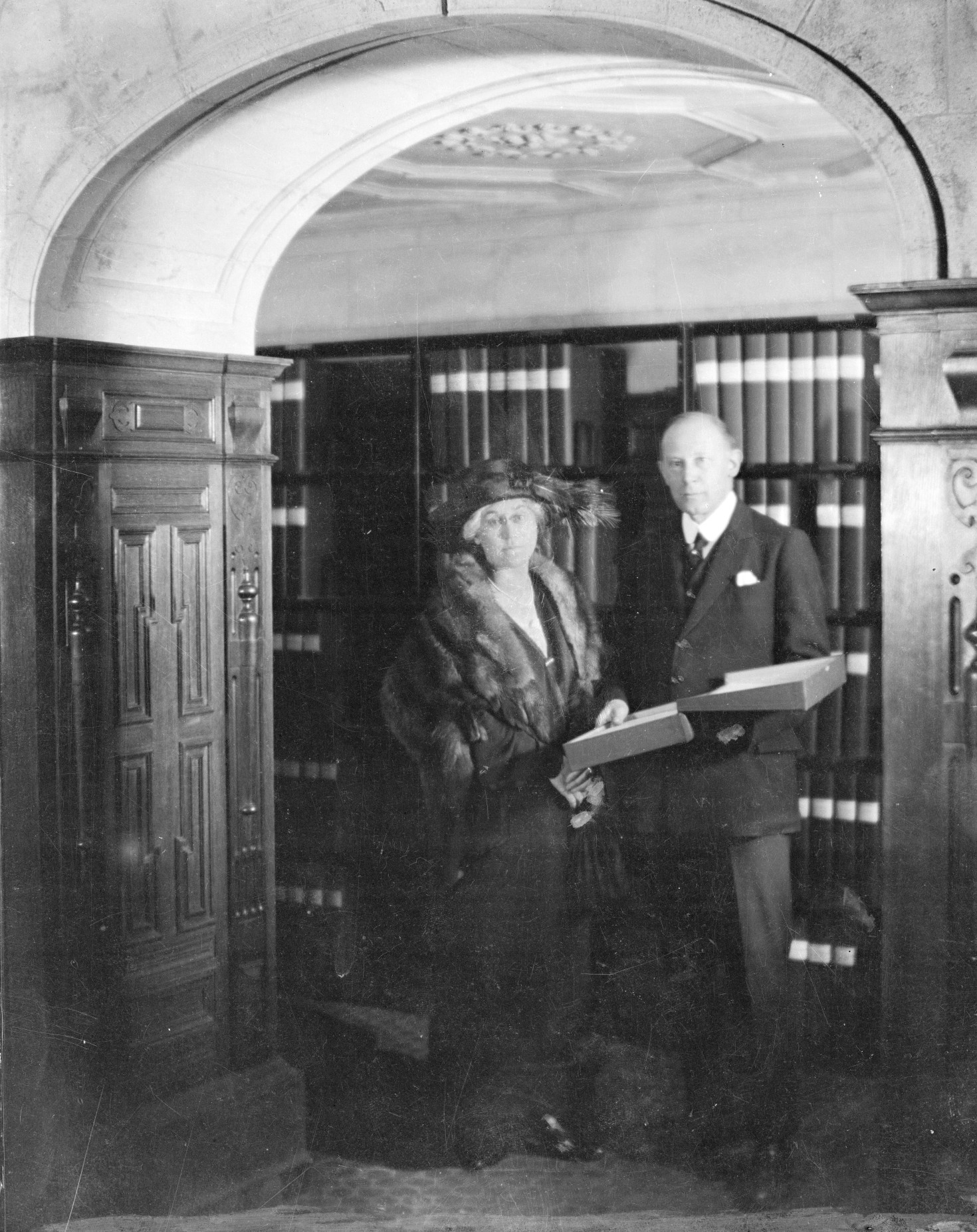
Sir Robert Witt and Mary Helene Marten Witt visiting the Photoarchive in the bowling alley of 1 East 70th Street, October 1923.

From 1922 to 1967, Miss Frick organized expeditions of library staff to photograph works of art in Europe and across the United States, many in private or little-known public collections and largely inaccessible to the public and unlikely to be published. Several of the United States photographic campaigns can be explored in an interactive digital map on the Frick's website, which uses GIS technology.

The Photoarchive continues to acquire photographs and digital images, focusing on works of art that are unpublished or by women, minority groups, or otherwise little-known artists. When possible, it collects multiple images for each work of art that show it in different physical states, as well as rarely seen preparatory drawings, alternate versions, copies, and forgeries. Many reproductions acquired by the Photoarchive document works of art that subsequently have been altered, lost, or destroyed. Its staff actively researches the collection to maintain current information on changes of attribution, current repository, and provenance, and invites contributions from collectors, institutions, and art historians.

== Access and Digitization ==
The Photoarchive is systematically digitizing its entire collection. High-resolution images and documentation for over 400,000 works of art are available online on Frick Digital Collections and in the library's online catalog. Both sites can be searched by artist, collection history, and multiple other criteria. Materials that are not digitized can be requested for consultation onsite in the Frick Art Research Library reading room. Its collection is frequently highlighted on The Frick Collection's official social media pages with #FrickPhotoarchive and #PhotoarchiveFind.

The Frick Photoarchive is a founding member of PHAROS, the International Consortium of Photo Archives, a digital research platform for comprehensive consolidated access to photo archive images and their associated scholarly documentation from its thirteen (as of 2026) European and North American member institutions. It launched Artresearch.net in November 2025.

== See also ==
- List of online image archives
- Reist, Inge Jackson. "The Frick Photoarchive: A Treasury of Unpublished Images of Works of Art." Frick Collection Members' Magazine (Fall 2003): 9-11.
- Knox, Katharine McCook. The Story of the Frick Art Reference Library: The Early Years. New York: The Library, 1979. OCLC 5196423.
