= Helen Clay Frick =

American philanthropist and art collector

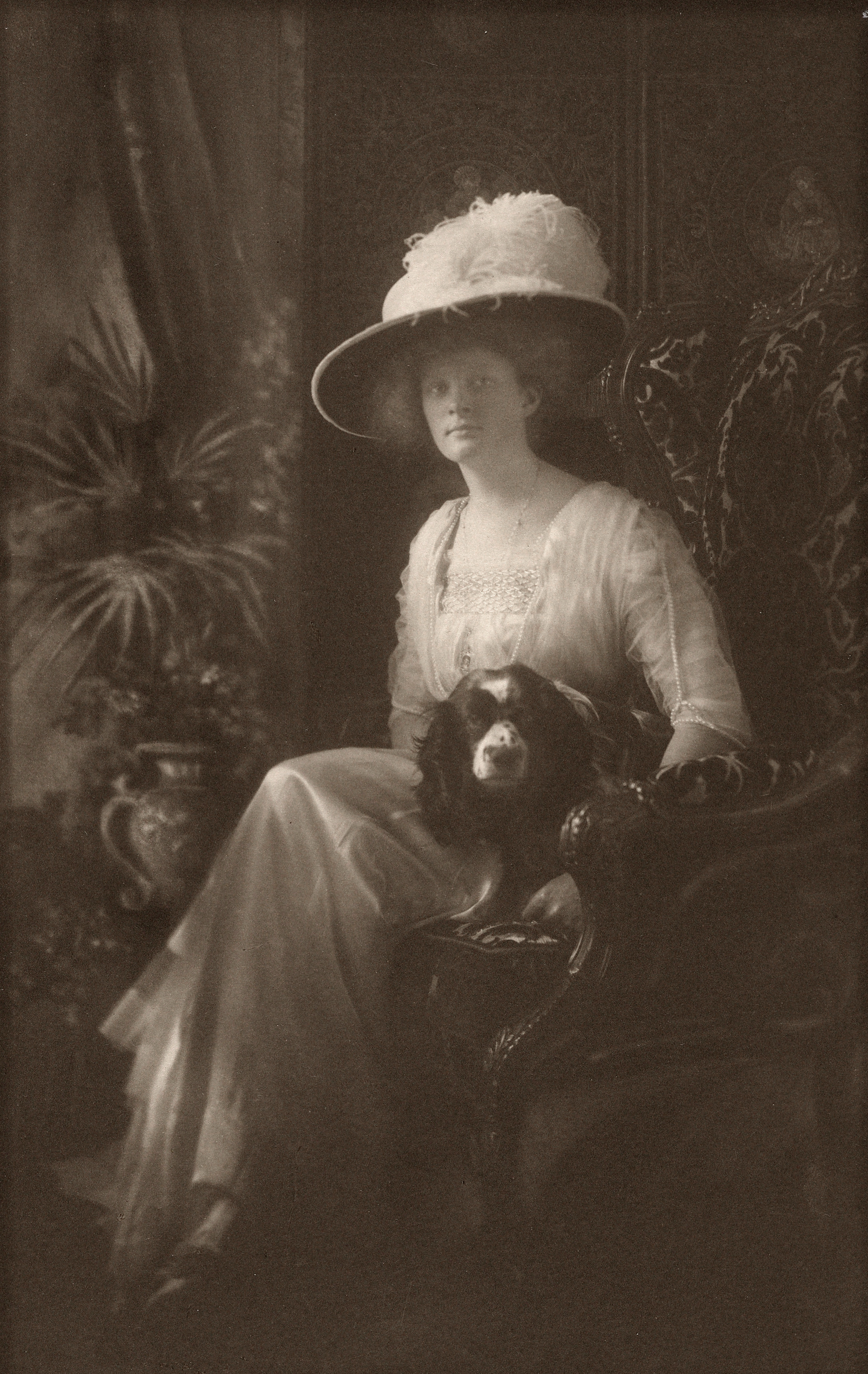
- Photograph of Frick in 1910
- Born: September 2, 1888; Pittsburgh, Pennsylvania, U.S.
- Died: November 9, 1984 (aged 96); Pittsburgh, Pennsylvania, U.S.
- Occupations: Philanthropist, art collector
- Parent(s): Henry Clay Frick; Adelaide Howard Childs

Helen Clay Frick (September 2, 1888 – November 9, 1984) was an American philanthropist and art collector. She was born in Pittsburgh, Pennsylvania, the third child of the coke and steel magnate Henry Clay Frick (1849–1919) and his wife, Adelaide Howard Childs (1859–1931). Two of her siblings did not reach adulthood, and her father favored her over his other surviving child, Childs Frick (1883–1965). After the reading of their father's will, which greatly benefited Helen, the brother and sister were estranged for the rest of their lives.

She was equally interested in art history and philanthropy, and she made a catalogue of her father's art collection as a young woman. The best of these works became part of the Frick Collection, a museum in New York, while others remained in Pittsburgh. Her interest in the history of art resulted in her establishing the Frick Art Reference Library, which was originally housed in the bowling alley of the Frick family mansion in New York City at 1 East 70th Street. In 1924, a separate two and one-half story building was constructed at 6 East 71st Street to house the library, which was replaced in 1935 by the present thirteen story building at 10 East 71st Street. The Library houses photographs and archival records that document the history of Western art, many of which were lost during World Wars I and II. She also established an art library at the University of Pittsburgh and, later in her life, built the Frick Art Museum on the grounds of Clayton to house part of her private art collection.

Her interests and philanthropy efforts also extended to the environment. In 1908, she requested that her debutante gift from her father be a donation of land to the city of Pittsburgh for the purpose of becoming a public park. This land donation would become Frick Park. In the 1950s, she made her own land donation and established Westmoreland Sanctuary, a nature preserve in Mount Kisco, New York. She was also an avid gardener and belonged to the Bedford Garden Club.

== Early life in Pittsburgh and New York ==
Helen's father was chairman of the Carnegie Steel Company, a partner in business with Andrew Carnegie. In 1901, J.P. Morgan acquired Carnegie and other corporations to form the United States Steel Corporation. Helen's early life was shaped by her father's wealth and reputation as a ruthless industrialist and union strikebreaker, and also by the attempt on his life by Alexander Berkman, after the Homestead Strike of 1892. The strike lasted 60 days, resulted in 10 deaths and 60 wounded – Henry Clay Frick had brought in 300 armed Pinkerton agents to quell the strike, which only ended when the National Guard was sent in by the order of Pennsylvania's governor. Frick's actions were supported by industrialists and bankers such as Andrew Mellon and J. P. Morgan, but he was seen as an enemy of the working class. and he became known as "Frick, the strike breaker". Two days after a July 23, 1892, assassination attempt, Frick's newborn son died.

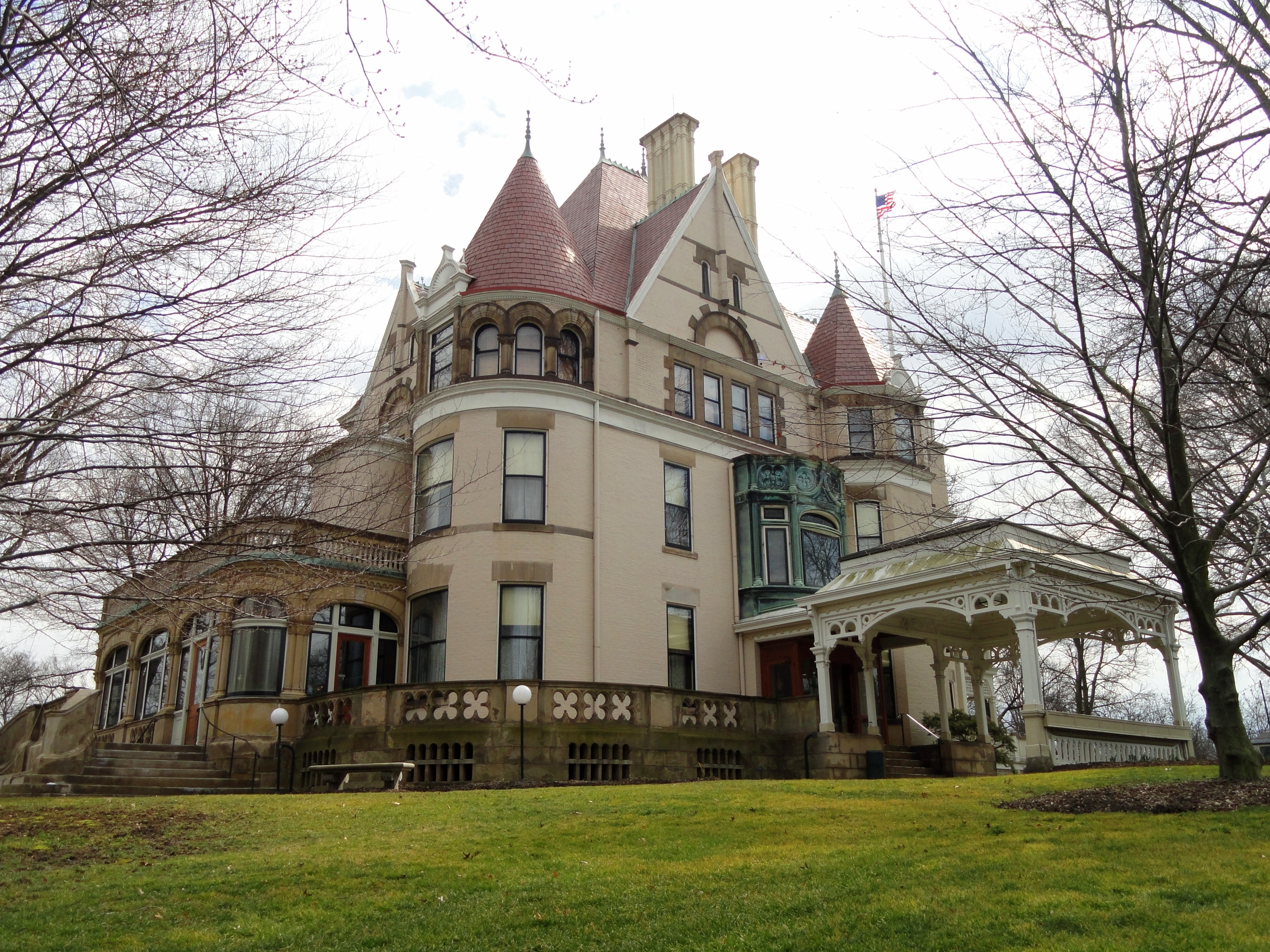
Clayton, the Frick family's Pittsburgh mansion

A year earlier his first-born daughter, Martha, died – from swallowing a pin while on a trip in Europe – after suffering excruciatingly painful effects that lasted several years. Her sister's illness formed Helen's earliest memories. After the deaths of her siblings, Helen grew up in a household of obsessive mourning, and she was greatly affected by witnessing her sister's death. She grew up in Pittsburgh on the family's estate, Clayton, where she was educated by a Swiss governess. As a child she showed an interest in her father's art collection, going so far as advising and giving opinions about various paintings. In the 1890s, after the Homestead Strike, Carnegie and Frick became bitter enemies after Carnegie attempted to hold Frick responsible for the bloodshed. They also fought over control of Carnegie's holdings.

At the end of the 1890s, Carnegie moved to New York, and Frick moved his family there a few years later, in 1905. He leased the Vanderbilt house at 640 5th Avenue, bought the old Lenox Library, demolished it, and began building the Henry Clay Frick House on 5th Avenue, on which he spent about $5 million. He employed a 27-member staff to cater to himself, his wife, and Helen. Helen went to finishing school at the Spence School, graduating in 1908. She returned frequently to Pittsburgh, where she had her social debut in 1906.

Helen traveled frequently and kept detailed diaries and notes about galleries and museums she visited. By age 17, she had been to Europe nine times, visiting the Louvre, Uffizi, Prado, Pinakothek, the National Gallery, as well as visiting churches and cathedrals. Additionally, she gained access to private collections with her father on buying expeditions. It was during these trips that she became interested in art archives, spending time in the archives at London's Record Office and in Paris' Musee des Archives. In 1908, she went with her family to Europe where they visited London, Paris, Madrid, Barcelona and Florence. In Paris, Helen, her father and brother visited Alphonse James de Rothschild's widow, the Baroness Rothschild, whose art collection was reputedly the most important in Europe. Helen's father bought two El Grecos on Helen's advice.

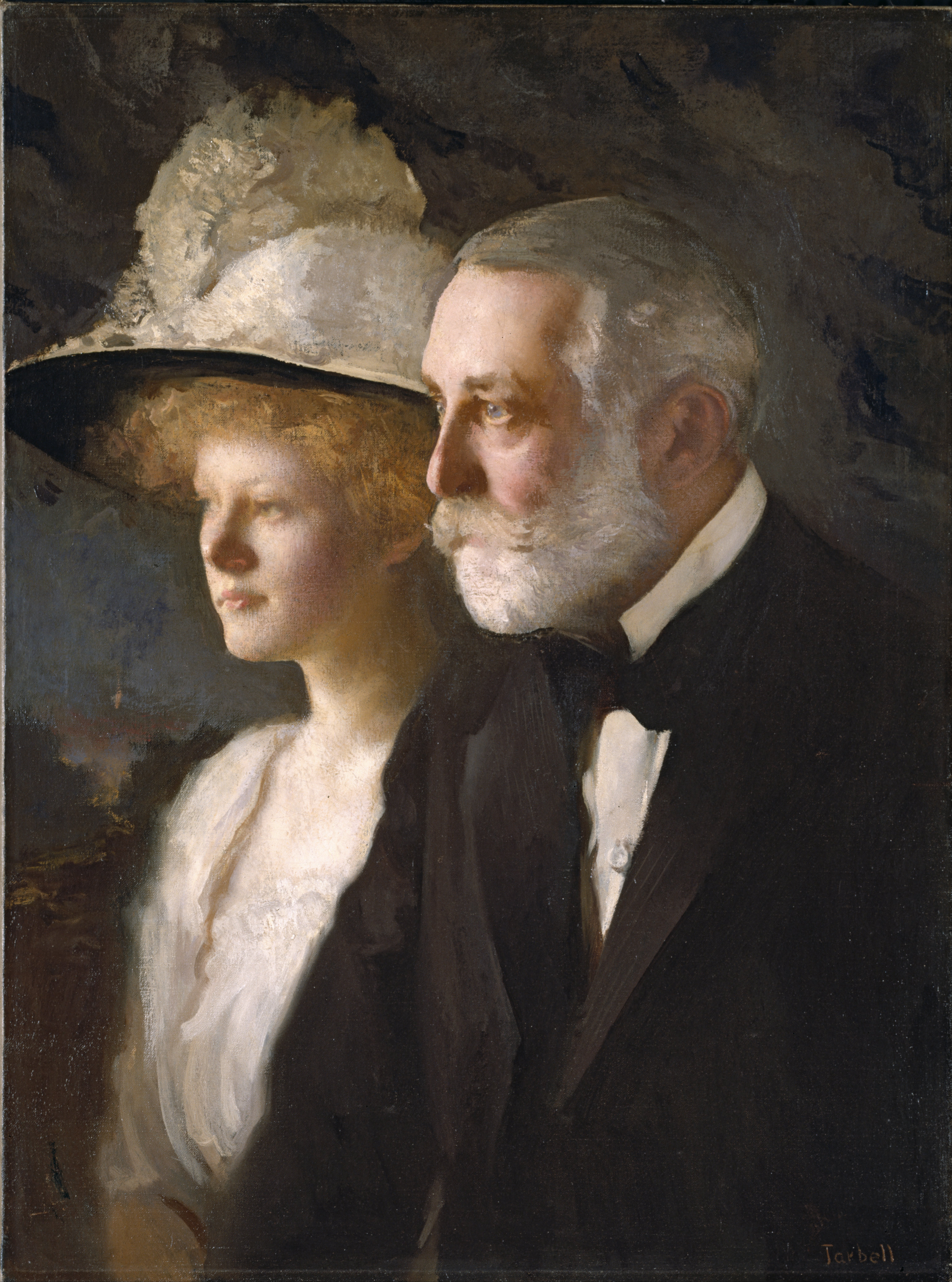
Helen Frick and her father, portrait by Edmund Charles Tarbell, c. 1910

Back in New York, she established a home for women textile workers in Wenham, Massachusetts. On a visit to Boston's North Shore, she had become aware of the life of shoe-workers in Lynn, Massachusetts, and in the textile mills farther north, and upon her return from Europe she asked her father to purchase a home to provide the women with the opportunity to rest and recuperate. The home became known as the "Iron Rail Vacation Home for Working Girls".

== World War I and inheritance ==
In 1917, when the United States entered World War I, the romantic relationship between Helen and Fordyce St. John was severed when his hospital sent him to serve in a surgical unit at a war hospital in northern France. The relationship may have begun as early as 1913, but the two kept it quiet, although they were seen together in public on occasion. St. John apparently adored Helen and she seemed to be in love with him, and an engagement announcement between the two had been expected before his departure. Why he left for Europe without following through on his promise to marry Helen is unknown, but was perhaps because Helen's brother told St. John that Frick would never sanction a marriage between the two.

Helen decided to join the war effort: she applied for and received permission to establish a Frick unit under the Red Cross. With four other women, Helen left for France in November 1917, arriving in Paris in December where she went to work immediately helping to wrap 150,000 Christmas packages being sent to soldiers at the front. After Christmas she arrived in Bourg-en-Bresse where her unit worked with refugee women and children. Eventually she would become responsible for refugees in 70 villages, and she asked her father for funds to build an orphanage. During that trip she witnessed the destruction of art works and churches.

She chose never to marry and, on her father's death in 1919, when she was 31, she inherited $38 million, making her the country's wealthiest unmarried woman. She received $5 million outright; the rest in shares, properties and companies; as well as $15 million to endow the Frick art collection and control of the collection – which would become entirely hers if the city of New York refused its offer as a museum. Her mother and older brother, Childs Frick, received considerably less, which would cause ongoing tension and conflict for Helen in future years. In the meantime, she bought a farm in Bedford Village, New York, and joined the exclusively male board of the Frick collection.

== Art archives and Frick Collection ==
She devoted her adult life to defending her father's public image from attack and continuing his tradition of philanthropy. The Frick Collection in New York was founded from Frick's personal art collection, as established in his will. Helen became trustee for the Frick Collection and was heavily involved in early acquisitions. Before Frick's death, by the time she was 25, she had embarked on a project of cataloguing the family's private collections, photographing the art work and collecting provenance data. After his death, she devoted ten years to learning about museum management and preparing to turn the Frick residence into the Frick Collection.

In 1920, she went back to Europe, revisiting sites she had known before the war, taking pictures and documenting the damage. In northern France, traveling through Berry-au-Bac and on to Soissons, she was appalled at the destruction, particularly to Soissons Cathedral. She photographed the damage, accumulating a record of the devastation wrought during the war. It was on that trip that she came to blame the Germans for damaging sites she had visited before the war, an attitude that would strengthen throughout her life.

Rogier van der Weyden Deposition, (or copy of) held at Palazzo Bianco. Photograph in the Frick Digital Archives.

In London Robert Witt (who went on to found the Courtauld Institute of Art) showed her the Library of Reproductions for the National Gallery, which held 150,000 photographs, spanning six centuries. Entranced with his archiving model, Helen asked whether she could copy it. He told her she could and that he would help. Upon her return to New York she began assembling an archive of 13,000 records, beginning with the Frick family collection of catalogs, postcards and photographs, mounting each reproduction and labeling it with information about artist, provenance, exhibition histories for future reference. She went on to hire agents in Europe to buy catalogues and she hired a professional photographer to begin photographing art in the US and in Europe, in "the days when one could almost buy some works of art for the cost of making photographs of them." She converted the mansion's basement bowling alley to store the collection, and despite its location it soon gained a reputation among art historians. Eventually the references were moved to New York where the Frick Art Reference Library opened in 1924, in a single story building on E. 71st Street.

In the mid-1920s she responded to John Gabbert Bowman's request for funding the University of Pittsburgh. The institution was deeply in debt and had cut fine arts courses, but the acquisition of land in Oakland that previously belonged to the Frick estate provided space in Oakland for expansion. Bowman wanted to build a "cathedral of light" there; Helen funded the university's fine arts department with the proviso of "having the final selection of the department head." She went on to endow and found the university's teaching collection in 1928, and continued to give Bowman funds to pay workers to complete what eventually came to be called the Cathedral of Learning.

Early in the 1930s, after the 1931 death of her mother, she hired John Russell Pope to expand the Frick Reference Library into two adjacent townhouses. Pope built abundant shelving and windows, and a medieval-style office for Helen. Time magazine said of the building, it was "instantly recognized as one of the most important art libraries in the world." It would grow into a records library with over 300,000 books and exhibition catalogues, extensive auction and provenance records, and 1.2 million images of art from the 4th to the 20th centuries; it contains the only records for many pieces of art lost or destroyed during both World Wars. Between 1922 and 1967, Helen commissioned 57,000 large format negatives. In Italy church interiors were lit, making it possible to photograph centuries-old frescoes and altarpieces, such as the now-lost frescoes by Giovanni Baronzio. More than 8,000 photographs are attributed to Italian photographer Mario Sansoni, who worked for Helen for many years.

Worried at the outbreak of World War II and reminded of the devastation she witnessed during World War I, in 1941 Helen had every single record in the art archives microfilmed, which were stored, at first, in an underground bank vault, and later moved to the Midwest. As early as 1943, the Committee for the Protection of Cultural Treasures in War Areas was consulting with the library, compiling lists for the Monuments, Fine Arts, and Archives program, which located, identified and returned looted art at the end of World War II.

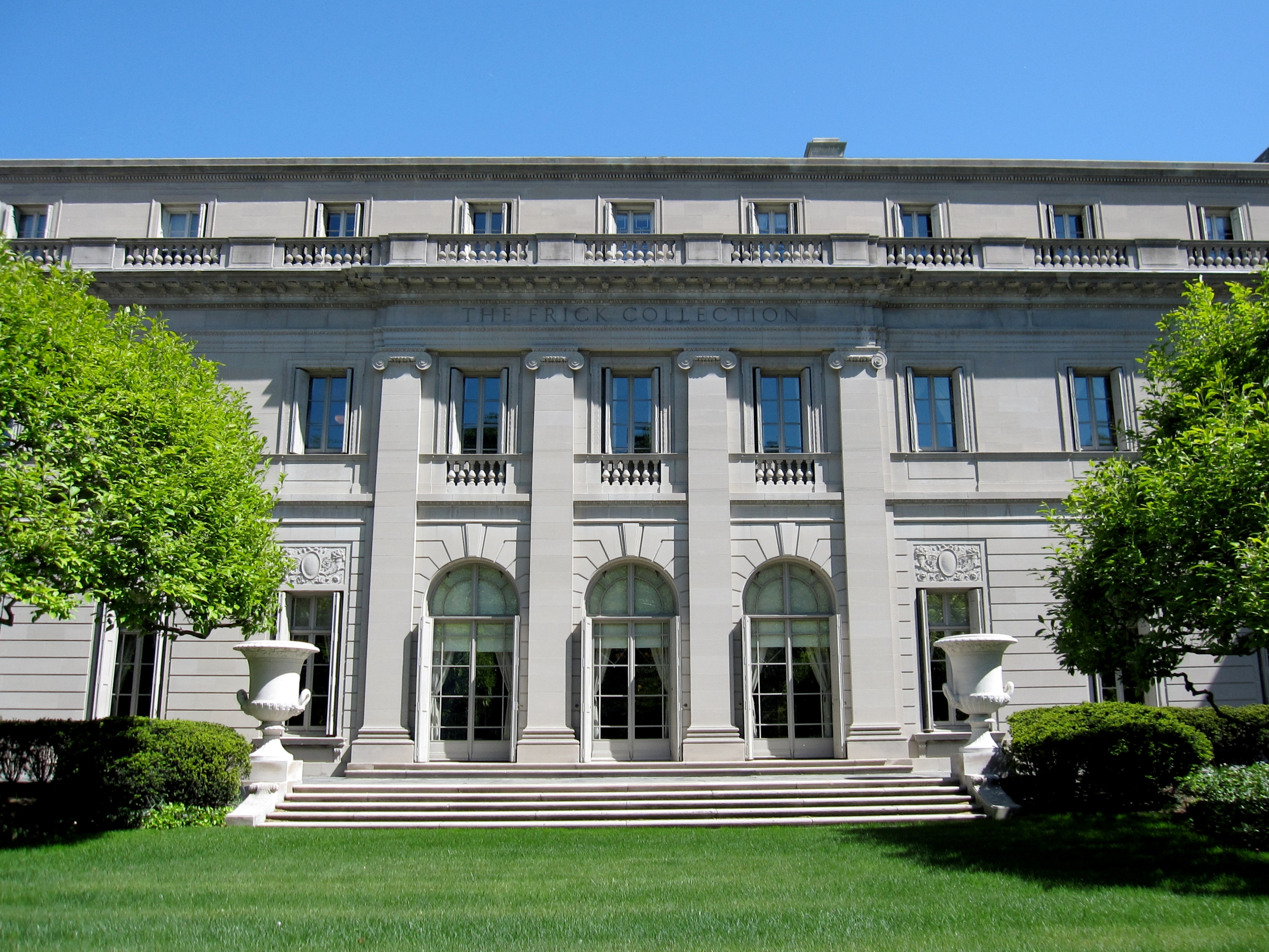
Henry Clay Frick House, now the site of the Frick Collection

The family's home on 5th Avenue was transformed into the Frick Collection in 1935. Helen continued as a trustee, to be active in acquisitions. A small woman, described as a "frail little woman," Helen was often in conflict with the male board members, in particular with John D. Rockefeller, whom her father had also appointed as trustee to the Frick Collection. The two fought over the manner in which the house should be transformed into a museum, whether the costly furniture should be kept (she wanted it, he did not), and Helen resisted his efforts to add pieces from his own collection. She eventually resigned the position in 1961, "in a fury," after gifts were accepted from Rockefeller.

== Later years ==
Helen also owned an estate in Westchester County, New York, known as Westmoreland Farms. She donated part of her land to create Westmoreland Sanctuary, a nature preserve, in 1957. She was insistent that there be no charge for visitors to the Sanctuary and was a lifelong supporter of the nonprofit.

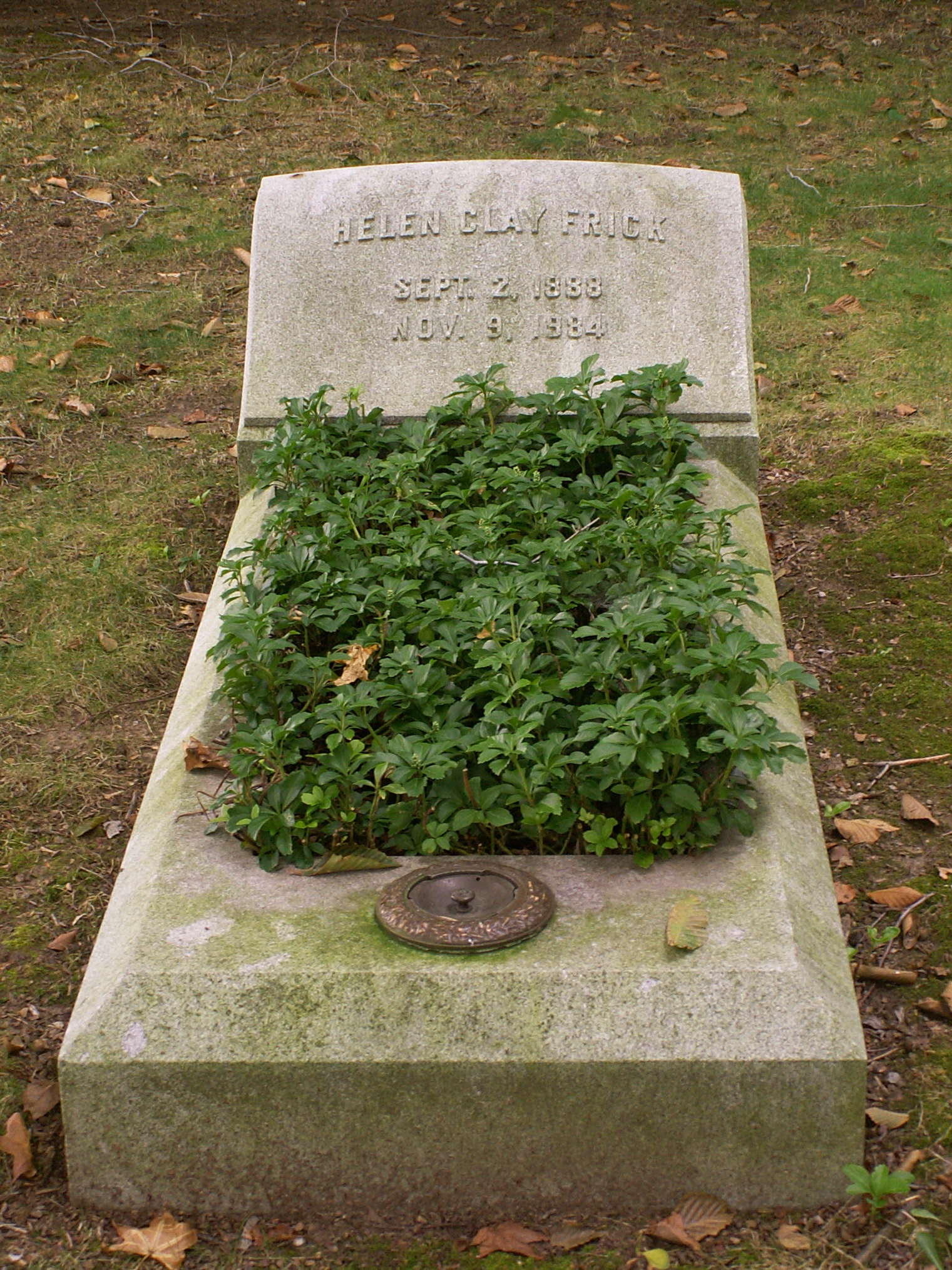
Grave at Homewood Cemetery in Pittsburgh, 2014

In the early 1960s, she funded the building of the Frick Fine Arts Building to house the fine arts department at the University of Pittsburgh. She was reticent about her involvement with the project and refused, at first, to have her name associated with it. Eventually she allowed a Pittsburgh reporter to interview her, revealing she was the building's donor. A dispute eventually severed the relationship with the university, involving the employment of Germans – Helen's World War I experience instilled an intense dislike of Germans she never overcame – in addition to the university's acquisition of modern art, which she equally disliked. In 1970, she built the Frick Art Museum on the grounds of Clayton to house her personal art collection.

In her later years Helen Frick guarded her father’s reputation, as she viewed him as a benevolent patron, against the judgement of professional historians who had determined he was a corrupt Gilded Age robber baron. Frick launched a libel suit in state court against Professor Sylvester Stevens, but the suit failed when Judge Clinton R. Widener, in 1967, determined that even if it were possible to defame a dead person, the historians had correctly captured Henry Frick’s largess, maltreatment of workers, and political corruption. Stevens had written a history of Pennsylvania in which he described the Homestead Strike and working conditions that Helen Frick took exception to. Helen Frick also supported Richard Nixon in his presidential candidacy in 1968 and again in 1970

Notoriously reclusive during her last years, she died at her Clayton home in Pittsburgh at age 96 on November 9, 1984, leaving a personal estate estimated to be worth $15 million. She is buried alongside her parents in the Frick family plot at Homewood Cemetery in Pittsburgh. Much of her later life was spent in Pittsburgh, at Clayton, where she kept a permanent staff. Clayton's second floor contains personal family archives spanning almost a century, which proved to be useful to architects when, after Helen's death, the house underwent a full restoration to its original state before opening to the public as a museum.

== Sources ==
- Lifson, Amy. "All The Art." Humanities. Volume 33, issue 2 (2012)
- Lockhard, Anne Ray. "Helen Clay Frick: Pittsburgh's Altruist and Gentlewoman Avenger". Journal of the Art Libraries Society of North America. Vol. 16, No. 2, (Fall 1997)
- Sanger, Martha Frick Symington (2007). Helen Clay Frick: Bittersweet Heiress. Pittsburgh: University of Pittsburgh Press. ISBN 9780822943419.
