= Jacob Vrel =

Dutch painter

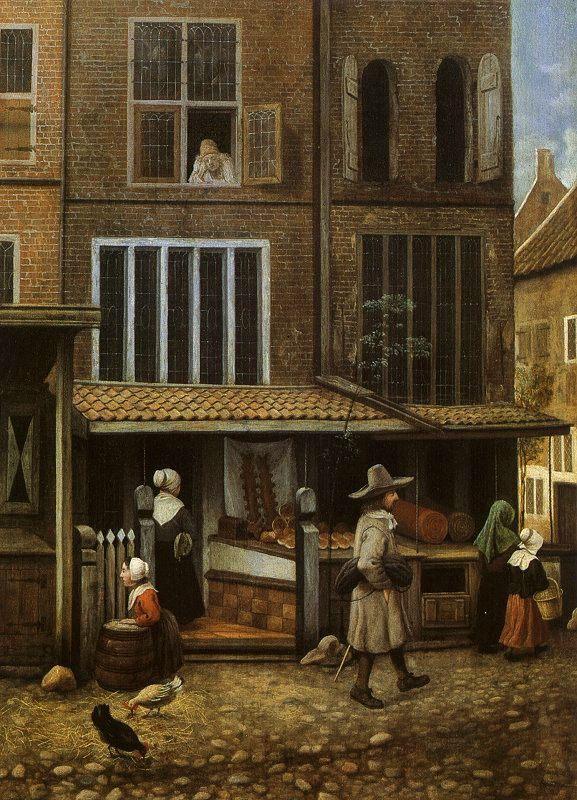
Street scene, ca. 1660

Jacob Vrel (fl. 1654 – c.1670) was a Dutch, Flemish, or Westphalian painter of interiors and urban street scenes during the Dutch Golden Age (1588–1672). He was likely most active from 1654 to 1662.

== Biography ==
Jacob Vrel is also referred to as Jan instead of Jacob(us); alternative spellings of his surname are Frel, Frelle, Vreele, Vrelle, and Vriel. Though Vrel's birthplace is unknown, scholars consider him a Dutch artist.

The lack of biographical information and challenging visual evidence has led scholars like Elizabeth Honig to call him "the most entirely elusive painter of 17th century Holland."

Despite the many architectural elements, bread products or clothing of the figures in his paintings, art historians are unable to assign most of Vrel's street scenes to any particular city or region. Vrel is thought to have composed them mostly from imagination. As of 2021, two experts have recognized streets and buildings of the Dutch city of Zwolle in three paintings.

== Style ==
According to the Netherlands Institute for Art History (Dutch RKD-Nederlands Instituut voor Kunstgeschiedenis), Vrel was a member of the same "school" or artistic style as Pieter de Hooch, showing simple intimate scenes of daily life in towns, often including studies in perspective. Though no evidence for a specific "school" exists, the center of influence seems to have been in the artistic centers of Haarlem and Delft, for artists born during the years 1620–1630. The painters listed by the RKD in this category are Esaias Boursse, Hendrick van der Burgh, Pieter de Hooch, Pieter Janssens Elinga, Cornelis de Man, Hendrick ten Oever, and Jacob Vrel.

Vrel's works are sometimes confused with those by Esaias Boursse or Pieter de Hooch. Vrel painted without glazes. He often painted his signature on a strip of paper or cloth in his painting, reminiscent of European medieval banners or scrolls. At least half of the pictures by Vrel contain signatures altered to read "Johannes Vermeer" or "Pieter de Hooch."

== Work ==
A range between thirty-eight and forty paintings have been attributed to Vrel before the 2021 catalogue raisonne, which names forty-nine.

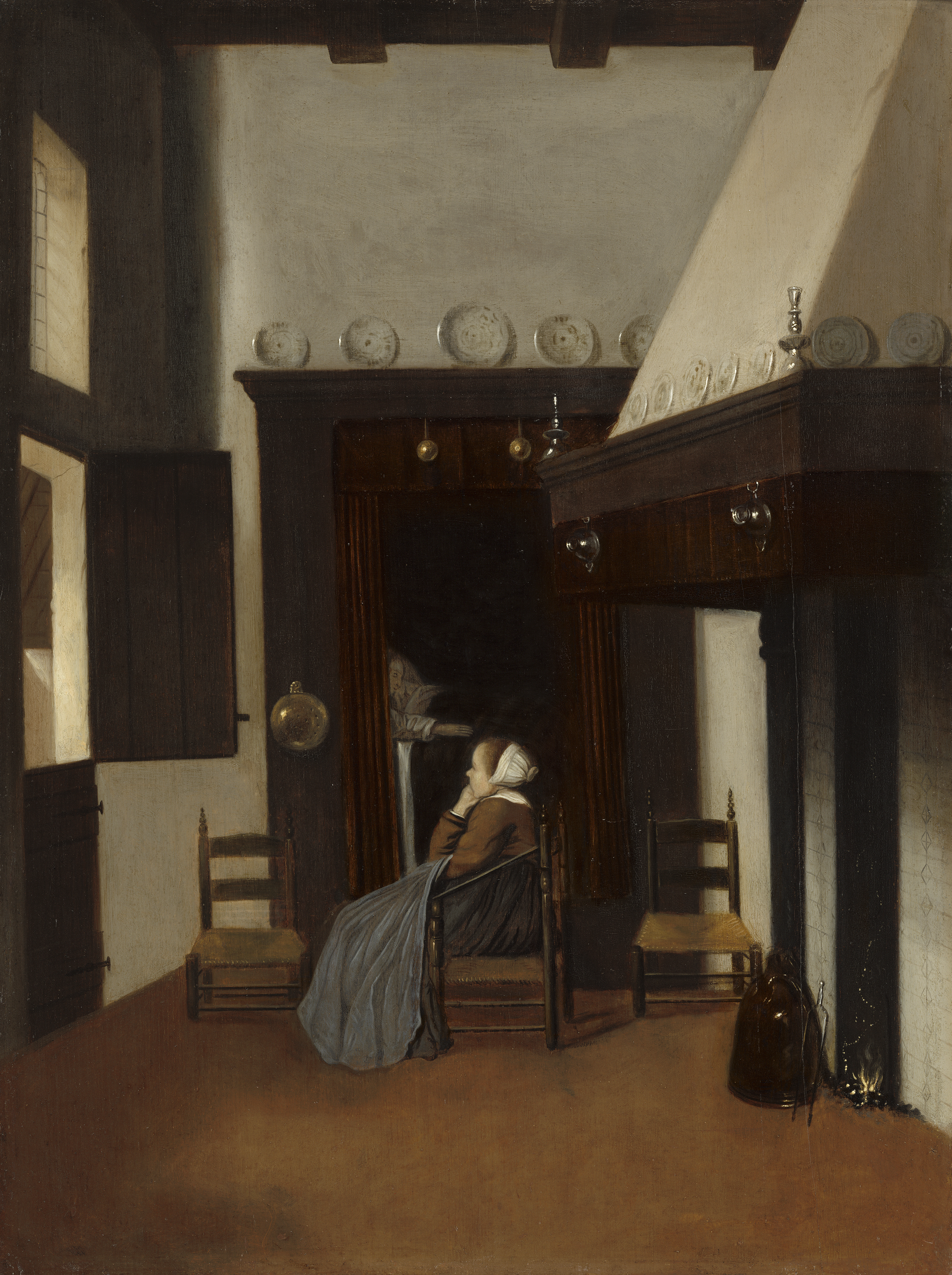
Young Woman in an Interior, ca. 1660. National Gallery of Art, Washington.

The following public collections contain Vrel´s work in their permanent holdings:

- Alte Pinakothek, Munich, Germany: Street Scene with Figures in Conversation
- Ashmolean Museum, Oxford, UK: The Little Nurse
- Detroit Institute of Arts, Detroit, US: Interior
- Fondation Custodia, Frits Lugt, Paris, France: A Seated Woman Looking at a Child
- Groninger Museum, Groningen, The Netherlands: Interior with a Man by a Fireplace
- Hermitage Museum, Saint Petersburg, Russia: Old Woman by a Fireplace
- Heylshof Museum, Worms, Germany: Two Cottage Women Conversing
- Hamburger Kunsthalle, Hamburg, Germany: Street Corner
- Kunsthistorisches Museum, Vienna, Austria: Woman at a Window, Landscape with Two Men and a Woman
- Landesmuseum, Oldenburg, Germany: Street Scene with Three Figures
- J. Paul Getty Museum, Los Angeles, US: Street Scene with People Conversing Near a Barber Shop.
- Museum de Fundatie, Heino/Zwolle, The Netherlands: Interior with a Busy Woman, 1650.
- National Gallery of Art, Washington, US: Young Woman in an Interior, ca. 1660.
- Palais des Beaux-Arts de Lille, Lille, France: The Weaver's Workshop
- Philadelphia Museum of Art, Philadelphia, US: Street Scene, mid-17th century
- Rijksmuseum, Amsterdam, The Netherlands: Alleyway in a Dutch Town; Woman in Front of a Stove
- Royal Museum of Fine Arts, Antwerp, Belgium: The Little Sick Nurse
- Royal Museums of Fine Arts, Brussels, Belgium: Interior with a Woman and a Child
- San Diego Museum of Art, San Diego, US: The Little Sick Nurse
- Thyssen-Bornemisza Museum, Madrid, Spain: Interior with Woman Seated by a Hearth
- Wadsworth Atheneum, Hartford, US: Square with a Bakery in Front of a Church
- Wallraf–Richartz Museum, Cologne, Germany: Interior with an Old Woman

A retrospective exhibition curated by Berndt Ebert of the Alte Pinakothek was to open in late 2020, combined printed exhibition catalog and catalogue raisonné by Ebert, Cécile Tainturier and Quentin Buvelot. In 2021, because of the coronavirus pandemic, the monographic exhibition on Vrel was rescheduled to be shown in 2023 at the Mauritshuis in The Hague, and then at the Fondation Custodia in Paris.

== Bibliography ==
- Théophile Thoré. "Van der Meer de Delft." Gazette des beaux-arts [suppl. is Chron. A.] 21 (1866): 458–470.
- Clotilde Brière-Misme. "Un 'Intimiste' hollandais: Jacob Vrel." Revue de l’art ancien et moderne 68 (1935): 97–114, 157–172.
- Gérard Regnier. "Jacob Vrel, un Vermeer du pauvre." Gazette des beaux-arts [suppl. is Chron. A.] n.s. 6, 71 (1968): 269–282.
- Peter Sutton, ed. Masters of Seventeenth-Century Dutch Genre Painting (exh. cat. Philadelphia Museum of Art; Gemäldegalerie, Berlin; Royal Academy, London, 1984): 352–354.
- Elizabeth Honig: "Looking in(to) Jacob Vrel." Yale Journal of Criticism 3, no. 1 (Fall, 1989): 37–56.
