= Quentin Buvelot =

Dutch art historian and curator (born 1969)

- Born: 1969 (age 56–57); Utrecht, Netherlands
- Education: Utrecht University (art history and archaeology)
- Occupations: Art historian, curator, and author
- Years active: 1994–present
- Employer: Mauritshuis
- Known for: Scholarship on seventeenth-century Dutch painting; exhibitions and collection catalogues at the Mauritshuis
- Notable work: Rembrandt by Himself; Frans van Mieris 1635–1681; The Still Lifes of Adriaen Coorte; Jacobus Vrel: In the Footsteps of a Mysterious Painter
- Title: Senior curator
- Board member of: Chair of the CODART Program Committee

Quentin Buvelot (born 1969 in Utrecht) is a Dutch art historian and curator specializing in Dutch Golden Age painting. He is chief curator of collections and research at the Mauritshuis in The Hague, where he has worked as a curator since the 1990s. The museum identifies him in Dutch as Hoofdconservator Collectie & Wetenschap and in English-language publications as senior curator.

His scholarship has focused on seventeenth-century Dutch and Flemish painting, including the work of Rembrandt, Johannes Vermeer, Frans van Mieris the Elder, Jacob van Ruisdael, Adriaen Coorte, Philips Wouwerman, and Jacobus Vrel.

His publications also address portraiture, genre painting, still life, museum architecture, the formation of collections, the history of the Mauritshuis and the use of conservation and technical examination in art-historical research.

== Early life and career ==
Buvelot studied art history and archaeology at Utrecht University from 1987 to 1993. He subsequently worked at the university as a junior lecturer in 1994. From June 1994 to May 1995, he served as a guest curator at the Koninklijk Paleis in Amsterdam, where he helped prepare an exhibition devoted to the architect and painter Jacob van Campen. The accompanying publication, Jacob van Campen: Het klassieke ideaal in de Gouden Eeuw, was written with Koen Ottenheym, Marten Jan Bok, Eymert-Jan Goossens and Marijke Spies.

From 1996 to 1998, Buvelot worked on behalf of the Paris-based Fondation Custodia, which houses the collection assembled by the art historian and collector Frits Lugt. During this period, he researched the Dutch and Flemish paintings in the Musée Fabre in Montpellier. The resulting catalogue, prepared with Michel Hilaire and Olivier Zeder, accompanied exhibitions at the Institut Néerlandais in Paris and the Musée Fabre in 1998.

== Mauritshuis ==
=== Early curatorial work and collection catalogues, 1998–2007 ===
Buvelot joined the curatorial staff of the Mauritshuis during the 1990s. One of his first major projects at the museum was Rembrandt by Himself, an exhibition devoted to Rembrandt's self-portraits that was organized with the National Gallery in London and shown in London and The Hague in 1999–2000. Buvelot co-edited the accompanying catalogue with Christopher White; its contributors included Ernst van de Wetering, Volker Manuth, Marieke de Winkel and Edwin Buijsen.

During the following years, he worked on exhibitions and publications combining collection cataloguing with focused studies of artists and collectors. With Hans Buijs he organized A Choice Collection: Seventeenth-Century Dutch Paintings from the Frits Lugt Collection at the Mauritshuis in 2002. He subsequently edited the exhibition catalogue Albert Eckhout: A Dutch Artist in Brazil and contributed to Portraits in the Mauritshuis, 1430–1790, published in 2004. In the same year, he compiled the museum's English-language summary catalogue, Royal Picture Gallery Mauritshuis: A Summary Catalogue.

Buvelot was the principal curator and author of the monographic exhibition Frans van Mieris 1635–1681, held at the Mauritshuis in 2005–2006 and subsequently at the National Gallery of Art in Washington, D.C. The catalogue included essays by Otto Naumann and Eddy de Jongh, as well as contributions addressing individual paintings, drawings and Van Mieris's working methods. He later collaborated with Rudi Ekkart on Dutch Portraits: The Age of Rembrandt and Frans Hals, shown at the National Gallery in London in 2007 and at the Mauritshuis in 2007–2008.

=== Senior curator and monographic exhibitions, 2008–2011 ===
Buvelot became senior curator of the Mauritshuis in 2008. That year he organized an exhibition devoted to the still-life painter Adriaen Coorte. Its accompanying publication, The Still Lifes of Adriaen Coorte, included an oeuvre catalogue and contributed to the reassessment of an artist whose surviving paintings are generally small in scale and frequently depict isolated arrangements of fruit, nuts, shells or asparagus.

His subsequent projects included Jacob van Ruisdael Paints Bentheim in 2009 and a major exhibition devoted to Philips Wouwerman, organized with the Gemäldegalerie Alte Meister in Kassel and shown in Kassel in 2009 and at the Mauritshuis in 2009–2010. Buvelot edited the Wouwerman catalogue with the museum's former director Frederik Duparc. In 2010–2011, he organized Made in Holland, presenting works from the private collection of Eijk and Rose-Marie de Mol van Otterloo. Rather than arranging the accompanying book solely by artist, Buvelot grouped the paintings by genre in order to place landscapes, portraits, still lifes, history paintings and scenes of everyday life in relation to one another.

=== Closure, international tours and reopening, 2012–2016 ===
The Mauritshuis closed for renovation and expansion in 2012. During the closure, substantial selections from the collection travelled internationally. Masterpieces from the Royal Picture Gallery Mauritshuis was shown in Tokyo and Kobe in 2012–2013, while Girl with a Pearl Earring: Dutch Paintings from the Mauritshuis toured the United States from January 2013 to January 2014. The American tour brought over thirty paintings to the de Young Museum in San Francisco and the High Museum of Art in Atlanta, followed by a smaller selection at The Frick Collection in New York. Buvelot and Lea van der Vinde were among the principal authors and organizers associated with the touring exhibitions and their publications.

The renovated and expanded Mauritshuis reopened on 27 June 2014. For the reopening, Buvelot organized Mauritshuis—The Building and published a study of the seventeenth-century building, its changing interiors and its former garden. The project connected the history of the museum's collection with the architectural and decorative history of the house constructed for Johan Maurits.

Buvelot then collaborated with Desmond Shawe-Taylor, Surveyor of the Queen's Pictures, on Masters of the Everyday: Dutch Artists in the Age of Vermeer. Drawn from the Royal Collection, the exhibition examined seventeenth-century Dutch representations of domestic interiors, village life, taverns, courtyards and other scenes of everyday activity. It was presented at the Queen's Gallery in London, the Palace of Holyroodhouse in Edinburgh and the Mauritshuis between 2015 and 2017. In 2016, he also contributed to Genre Paintings in the Mauritshuis, a scholarly collection catalogue prepared with Ariane van Suchtelen and other members of the museum's staff.

=== Collection research and international partnerships, 2017–2020 ===
In 2017, Buvelot curated Slow Food: Dutch and Flemish Meal Still Lifes 1600–1640 together with Ariane van Suchtelen and Charlotte Rulkens. The exhibition examined the development of the meal still life through paintings by artists including Clara Peeters, Floris van Dijck, Nicolaes Gillis and Pieter Claesz. Buvelot edited the catalogue, which included contributions on the foods, utensils, tableware and patterns of consumption represented in the paintings.

His article “Rembrandt in the Mauritshuis: Work in Progress”, published in 2017, surveyed the changing attribution, conservation and technical examination of paintings assigned to Rembrandt and his workshop in the museum's collection. It discussed research surrounding works including Saul and David, whose restoration and reattribution had involved an international team of curators, conservators and technical specialists.

In 2018, Buvelot co-curated Prized Possessions: Dutch Paintings from National Trust Houses with Rupert Goulding and David Taylor. The exhibition assembled Dutch seventeenth-century paintings preserved in historic houses administered by the British National Trust, including works whose customary display within domestic collections had limited their availability for international museum exhibitions.

His research during this period also extended to the historical movement of collections. In 2020, he published a study of paintings removed from the stadholder's picture gallery in The Hague and transported to Paris following the French invasion of the Netherlands in 1795.

=== Recent projects, 2021–present ===
Buvelot collaborated with Bernd Ebert and Cécile Tainturier on the first comprehensive monograph and catalogue raisonné devoted to Jacobus Vrel. Published in 2021, the volume combined archival investigation, close visual analysis, dendrochronology and other forms of technical examination in an effort to reconstruct Vrel's small and poorly documented oeuvre. Several works by Vrel had historically been attributed to Vermeer or to Pieter de Hooch.

The research led to Vrel, Forerunner of Vermeer, the first monographic museum exhibition devoted to the artist. It was presented at the Mauritshuis in 2023 and subsequently at the Fondation Custodia in Paris. The exhibition brought together Vrel's quiet domestic interiors and street scenes, including the only dated painting currently known from his oeuvre, Woman at the Window of 1654.

In 2022, Buvelot curated Manhattan Masters, organized to conclude the Mauritshuis's bicentenary year. The exhibition presented ten Dutch paintings from The Frick Collection, including Rembrandt's large Self-Portrait of 1658, alongside works by Vermeer, Frans Hals, Jacob van Ruisdael and Aelbert Cuyp. It marked the first occasion on which the Frick lent this group of paintings to a European museum.

Buvelot produced the 2025 exhibition Facing the Storm: A Museum in Wartime, which examined the Mauritshuis during the German occupation of the Netherlands from 1940 to 1945. Using paintings, empty frames, photographs, film, sound recordings, archival documents and personal accounts, the exhibition addressed the evacuation and protection of the collection, the museum's proximity to the political centre of the occupation authorities, Nazi cultural policy and the experiences of the family of museum manager Mense de Groot, who lived in the building's basement during the war.

== Publications and professional activities ==
Buvelot has written and edited exhibition catalogues, collection catalogues, monographs and scholarly articles on Dutch art and the history of collecting. His principal publications include Rembrandt by Himself, Royal Picture Gallery Mauritshuis: A Summary Catalogue, Frans van Mieris 1635–1681, The Still Lifes of Adriaen Coorte, Jacob van Ruisdael Paints Bentheim, Masters of the Everyday: Dutch Artists in the Age of Vermeer, Slow Food: Dutch and Flemish Meal Still Lifes 1600–1640, Prized Possessions: Dutch Paintings from National Trust Houses, Manhattan Masters and the catalogue raisonné of Jacobus Vrel.

Buvelot has been a member of CODART, the international network of curators of Dutch and Flemish art, since 1999. He joined its programme committee in 2019 and was appointed chair of the committee in 2020. The committee develops themes and programmes for CODART congresses and focus meetings and serves as a consultative body for the network.

In 2017, he became a member of the advisory council of Vereniging Rembrandt, which advises the association on matters including applications for support for museum acquisitions. He also served on the board of the Stichting Cornelis Hofstede de Groot, the Friends organization associated with the RKD – Netherlands Institute for Art History. His term on that board ended on 1 November 2020.

== Selected exhibitions and catalogues ==
- Manhattan Masters: Dutch Paintings from the Frick Collection (2022–2023), Mauritshuis, The Hague. Catalogue: Quentin Buvelot, Manhattan Masters: Dutch Paintings from the Frick Collection (Mauritshuis Foundation and Waanders Uitgevers, 2022), ISBN 978-94-6262-429-0.
- Prized Possessions: Dutch Paintings from National Trust Houses (2018–2019), Mauritshuis, The Hague; Holburne Museum, Bath; and Petworth House, West Sussex. Catalogue: David Taylor and Quentin Buvelot, Prized Possessions: Dutch Paintings from National Trust Houses (Paul Holberton Publishing, 2018), ISBN 978-1-911300-24-3.
- Slow Food: Still Lifes of the Golden Age (2017), Mauritshuis, The Hague. Catalogue: Quentin Buvelot, Yvonne Bleyerveld, Milou Goverde, Zoran Kwak, Anne Lenders, Fred G. Meijer, and Charlotte Rulkens, Slow Food: Dutch and Flemish Meal Still Lifes, 1600–1640 (Mauritshuis and Waanders Uitgevers, 2017), ISBN 978-94-6262-117-6.
- Masters of the Everyday: Dutch Artists in the Age of Vermeer (2015–2017), Queen's Gallery, Buckingham Palace, London; Queen's Gallery, Palace of Holyroodhouse, Edinburgh; and Mauritshuis, The Hague. Catalogue: Desmond Shawe-Taylor and Quentin Buvelot, Masters of the Everyday: Dutch Artists in the Age of Vermeer (Royal Collection Trust, 2015), ISBN 978-1-909741-19-5.
- La ragazza con l'orecchino di perla: Il mito della Golden Age: Da Vermeer a Rembrandt: Capolavori dal Mauritshuis (2014), Palazzo Fava, Bologna. Catalogue: Quentin Buvelot and Lea van der Vinde, La ragazza con l'orecchino di perla: Il mito della Golden Age: Da Vermeer a Rembrandt: Capolavori dal Mauritshuis (Linea d'ombra, 2014).
- Girl with a Pearl Earring: Dutch Paintings from the Mauritshuis (2013–2014), de Young Museum, San Francisco; High Museum of Art, Atlanta; and The Frick Collection, New York. Catalogue: Lea van der Vinde, ed., Girl with a Pearl Earring: Dutch Paintings from the Mauritshuis (Prestel, 2013), ISBN 978-3-7913-5225-1.
- Made in Holland: Highlights from the Collection of Eijk and Rose-Marie de Mol van Otterloo (2010–2011), Mauritshuis, The Hague. Catalogue: Quentin Buvelot, Made in Holland: Highlights from the Collection of Eijk and Rose-Marie de Mol van Otterloo (Mauritshuis and Waanders Uitgevers, 2010), ISBN 978-90-400-7744-9.
- Philips Wouwerman 1619–1668 (2009–2010), Museum Schloss Wilhelmshöhe, Kassel, and Mauritshuis, The Hague. Catalogue: Frederik Duparc and Quentin Buvelot, Philips Wouwerman (Hirmer, 2009), ISBN 978-3-7774-2251-0.
- Jacob van Ruisdael Paints Bentheim (2009), Mauritshuis, The Hague. Catalogue: Quentin Buvelot, Jacob van Ruisdael Paints Bentheim (Mauritshuis and Waanders Uitgevers, 2009), ISBN 978-90-400-8598-7.
- Ode aan Coorte (2008), Mauritshuis, The Hague. Catalogue: Quentin Buvelot, The Still Lifes of Adriaen Coorte (active c. 1683–1707): With Oeuvre Catalogue (Mauritshuis and Waanders Uitgevers, 2008), ISBN 978-90-400-8502-4.
- Dutch Portraits: The Age of Rembrandt and Frans Hals (2007–2008), National Gallery, London, and Mauritshuis, The Hague. Catalogue: Rudi Ekkart and Quentin Buvelot, Dutch Portraits: The Age of Rembrandt and Frans Hals (National Gallery and Mauritshuis, 2007), ISBN 978-3-7630-2491-9.
- Frans van Mieris 1635–1681 (2005–2006), Mauritshuis, The Hague, and National Gallery of Art, Washington, D.C. Catalogue: Quentin Buvelot, Frans van Mieris 1635–1681 (Mauritshuis and Waanders Uitgevers, 2006), ISBN 90-400-8161-1.
- Albert Eckhout: A Dutch Artist in Brazil (2004), Mauritshuis, The Hague. Catalogue: Quentin Buvelot, ed., Albert Eckhout: A Dutch Artist in Brazil (Mauritshuis and Waanders Uitgevers, 2004), ISBN 90-400-8969-8.
- A Choice Collection: Seventeenth-Century Dutch Paintings from the Frits Lugt Collection (2002), Mauritshuis, The Hague. Catalogue: Quentin Buvelot and Hans Buijs, A Choice Collection: Seventeenth-Century Dutch Paintings from the Frits Lugt Collection (Mauritshuis and Waanders Uitgevers, 2002), ISBN 90-400-9674-0.
- Rembrandt by Himself (1999–2000), National Gallery, London, and Mauritshuis, The Hague. Catalogue: Christopher White, Quentin Buvelot, and Edwin Buijsen, Rembrandt by Himself (National Gallery Publications and Mauritshuis, 1999), ISBN 978-1-85709-270-7.
- Tableaux flamands et hollandais du Musée Fabre de Montpellier (1998), Institut Néerlandais, Paris, and Musée Fabre, Montpellier. Catalogue: Quentin Buvelot, Michel Hilaire, and Olivier Zeder, Tableaux flamands et hollandais du Musée Fabre de Montpellier (Institut Néerlandais, Musée Fabre, and Waanders Uitgevers, 1998), ISBN 90-400-9234-6.

== Other selected publications ==
- With Bernd Ebert and Cécile Tainturier. Jacobus Vrel: In the Footsteps of a Mysterious Painter. Munich: Bayerische Staatsgemäldesammlungen and Hirmer, 2021. ISBN 978-3-7774-3586-2.
- With Peter van der Ploeg. Royal Cabinet of Paintings Mauritshuis: A Princely Collection. Zwolle: Waanders, 2005. ISBN 90-400-9174-9.
- With Ben Broos and Ariane van Suchtelen. Portraits in the Mauritshuis, 1430–1790. Zwolle: Waanders, 2004. ISBN 90-400-9000-9.
- With Peter van der Ploeg, Epco Runia, Ariane van Suchtelen, Martin Bijl, and Margaret Klinge. Dutch and Flemish Old Masters from the Kremer Collection. The Hague: Fondation Aetas Aurea, 2002. ISBN 90-90-16451-0.
