= Axel Rüger =

German art historian, curator and museum director

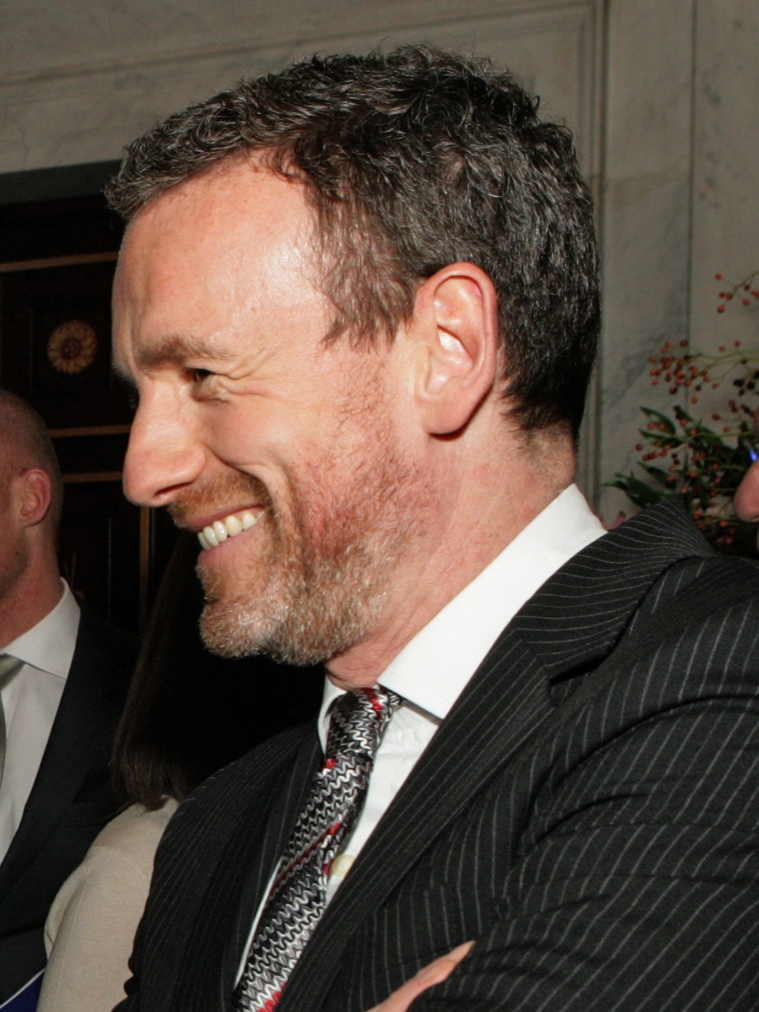
Rüger in 2015

Axel Rüger (born 1968 in Dortmund) is a German art historian, curator and museum director. He led the Royal Academy of Arts in London from 2019 through 2024, and in March 2025 assumed the directorship of the Frick Collection in New York City. Previously, he was director of the Van Gogh Museum in Amsterdam from 2006 to 2019, and worked as a curator of Dutch art at the National Gallery in London.

== Early life and education ==
Rüger studied history of art at the Free University of Berlin from 1989 to 1993, and then from 1993 to 1994 at the University of Cambridge. At Queen's University at Kingston, Ontario, he commenced writing a dissertation on the Dutch painter and architect Bartholomeus van Bassen. While he continued his research on Bassen at the Radboud-Universität in Nijmegen in 1998 and 1999, he has not completed the doctoral degree.

He completed internships at various museums, including at the Detroit Institute of Arts in the mid-1990s.

== Career ==
Rüger, a specialist in Johannes Vermeer and the Delft School, was appointed curator of Dutch art of the 17th century at the National Gallery in London in 1999. In 2004 he took part in the Clore Leadership Programme, which included a four-month practicum at the Royal Court Theatre in London.

From April 2006 to 2019, he was director of the Van Gogh Museum in Amsterdam and the Mesdag Collection in The Hague, and was succeeded there by Emilie Gordenker.

In June 2016, the Frankfurter Allgemeine Zeitung named Rüger as one of two most promising candidates to succeed Max Hollein in the directorship of the Städel/Schirn/Liebieghaus museum consortium in Frankfurt.

Rüger led the Royal Academy of Arts in London June 2019 through 2024. In September 2024 he was named successor to Ian Wardropper to lead the Frick Collection as Anna-Maria and Stephen Kellen Director, beginning in Spring 2025.

== Selected exhibitions curated ==
- 2001: Vermeer and the Delft School, Metropolitan Museum of Art, New York.
- 2002: Aelbert Cuyp, National Gallery of Art, Washington D.C.

== Selected publications ==
- Holländer im Portrait. Meisterwerke von Rembrandt bis Frans Hals. Cologne: Belser, 2007. ISBN 9783763024919
- "Palastinterieur von Bartholomeus van Bassen—Beobachtungen zur Arbeitsmethode anhand der Unterzeichnung.“ In Collected Opinions: Essays on Netherlandish Art in Honour of Alfred Bader. Festschift, edited by Volker Manuth, Axel Rüger. London: Paul Holberton, 2004. ISBN 1903470358
- Vermeer and the Delft School. Exh. cat. New York: Metropolitan Museum of Art, 2001. ISBN 9780870999734
- Vermeer and Painting in Delft. Exh. cat. London: National Gallery, 2001. ISBN 9780300091892
- Van Gogh keert terug: de gestolen schilderijen = Van Gogh Returns: The Stolen Paintings. Exh. cat. Amsterdam: Van Gogh Museum, 2017. ISBN 9789079310876
- (Contributor) Japonisme and the Rise of the Modern Art Movement: The Arts of the Meiji Period. London: Thames & Hudson, 2013. ISBN 978-0500239131
- Van Gogh Museum: The Building. Amsterdam: Nai010, 2016 ISBN 9789462082618
