= Cécile Tainturier =

French art historian and curator

- Education: Paris Nanterre University; Leiden University
- Occupations: Art historian, curator
- Employer: Fondation Custodia
- Known for: Scholarship on Dutch and Flemish art; research on Jacobus Vrel

Cécile Tainturier is a French art historian and curator specializing in early modern Dutch and Flemish art, particularly seventeenth-century drawings and paintings. She is a curator at the Fondation Custodia, Collection Frits Lugt, in Paris. She joined the institution as a junior curator in January 2007 and subsequently became a curator.

Her work encompasses exhibitions, scholarly catalogues, teaching, collection research and the conservation of Dutch and Flemish paintings and works on paper. She was one of the main scholars behind the first monographic exhibition and catalogue raisonné devoted to the seventeenth-century painter Jacobus Vrel.

== Education ==
Tainturier initially studied law in Cologne, intending to qualify as an art auctioneer in France. She completed a master's degree in German and French law before studying art history at the University of Paris X–Nanterre, now Paris Nanterre University. During an internship at the Jean-François Heim Gallery in Paris, she developed an interest in art-historical research rather than the commercial art market.

Her master's thesis examined the development of French pastel portraiture during the eighteenth century. She subsequently specialized in seventeenth-century Dutch art. In 1999 she approached art historian Eric Jan Sluijter about a research project concerning the teaching of drawing in Dutch artists' studios between 1600 and 1680.

Tainturier later held a four-year research-trainee appointment at Leiden University, where Sluijter supervised her doctoral research. She also taught with material from the university's collection of prints and drawings and participated in the Dutch Art History Research School.

== Career at Fondation Custodia ==
Tainturier joined Fondation Custodia as a two-year junior-curator in January 2007. She remained at the institution after developing a long-term interest in curatorial practice and has since worked on exhibitions, publications, collection cataloguing and teaching programs concerning the graphic arts and the artistic traditions of the early modern Netherlands. Fondation Custodia continues to list her as a member of its curatorial staff.

Her first major exhibition project at the foundation examined the Dutch and Flemish paintings held by the Musée des Beaux-Arts de Rouen. The resulting catalogue, published in 2009, contained fifty entries and formed a catalogue raisonné of the museum's Dutch and Flemish paintings; the associated exhibition was presented at the Institut Néerlandais in Paris in 2010.

Tainturier has participated in exhibitions and publications concerning collections including those of the Uffizi, the Hamburger Kunsthalle, the Museum Boijmans Van Beuningen, the Musée de Grenoble and the P. and N. de Boer Foundation. She also contributed to the exhibition and catalogue Hieronymus Cock: The Renaissance in Print, organized with M – Museum Leuven and the Royal Library of Belgium.

Alongside exhibition work, Tainturier has participated in the conservation of Fondation Custodia's Dutch and Flemish paintings. Working with the foundation's former director Ger Luijten, she helped oversee the cleaning and restoration of paintings and a program to place works in historically appropriate frames. She has also worked on the restoration and reorganization of albums containing seventeenth-century Dutch drawings.

Tainturier has been a member of CODART, the international network of curators of Dutch and Flemish art, since 2007. She joined the editorial board of CODARTfeatures in 2019.

== Curatorial and scholarly work ==
=== Drawings for Paintings in the Age of Rembrandt ===
Tainturier co-curated Drawings for Paintings in the Age of Rembrandt, organized jointly by Fondation Custodia and the National Gallery of Art in Washington, D.C. The exhibition was presented in Washington from October 2016 to January 2017 and in Paris from February to May 2017.

The exhibition brought together more than ninety drawings and twenty-seven paintings to examine the ways Dutch artists used compositional drawings, figure studies, construction drawings, sketchbooks and underdrawings during the painting process. Tainturier contributed catalogue entries to the accompanying scholarly publication.

=== Jacobus Vrel ===
Tainturier's research on Jacobus Vrel developed through a collaboration with Bernd Ebert of the Alte Pinakothek and Quentin Buvelot of the Mauritshuis. The project originated after a 2015 CODART study trip in the American Midwest, during which participants examined a Vrel painting in Detroit. Ebert later proposed a collaborative book and exhibition, and Buvelot subsequently joined the project.

Their monograph, Jacobus Vrel: Looking for Clues of an Enigmatic Painter, was published by Hirmer in 2021. The volume contained nine essays, technical and archival research, and a catalogue raisonné of the works then attributed to Vrel.

Tainturier contributed a historiographical study tracing Vrel's reception from the seventeenth century through his later association with Johannes Vermeer. Reviewers highlighted her examination of the gradual reconstruction of Vrel's artistic identity after works by him had been attributed to Vermeer and other Dutch painters.

The exhibition, described by Fondation Custodia as the first devoted exclusively to Vrel, opened at the Mauritshuis in The Hague in February 2023 and was presented at Fondation Custodia from June to September 2023.

== Selected exhibitions ==
- Tableaux flamands et hollandais du Musée des Beaux-Arts de Rouen, Institut Néerlandais, Paris, 2010 — curator and catalogue editor.
- Drawings for Paintings in the Age of Rembrandt, National Gallery of Art, Washington, D.C., 2016–2017; Fondation Custodia, Paris, 2017 — co-curator and catalogue contributor.
- Jacobus Vrel: Enigmatic Forerunner of Vermeer, Mauritshuis, The Hague, and Fondation Custodia, Paris, 2023 — co-curator with Bernd Ebert and Quentin Buvelot.

== Selected publications ==
- With Katja Kleinert, “Schilders uit de verf: Leidse ateliervoorstellingen uit de zeventiende eeuw”, in Beelden van Leiden: Zelfbeeld en representatie van een Hollandse stad in de vroegmoderne tijd, 1550–1800 (Uitgeverij Verloren, 2006).
- With Diederik Bakhuÿs and Jasper Hillegers, Tableaux flamands et hollandais du Musée des Beaux-Arts de Rouen (Fondation Custodia and Musée des Beaux-Arts de Rouen, 2009).
- Catalogue entries in Drawings for Paintings in the Age of Rembrandt, edited by Ger Luijten, Peter Schatborn and Arthur K. Wheelock Jr. (Skira, 2016).
- With Maud van Suylen, Children of the Golden Age: Works from the Fondation Custodia (Fondation Custodia, 2019).
- With Bernd Ebert and Quentin Buvelot, eds., Jacobus Vrel: Looking for Clues of an Enigmatic Painter (Hirmer, 2021).
- “Les caprices de Jan Moninx: Une récente acquisition de la Fondation Custodia redéfinit les contours du dessinateur”, in Mélanges autour du dessin en l’honneur d’Emmanuelle Brugerolles (Silvana Editoriale, 2022).
