= Hollein =

Hollein is a German surname. Notable people with the surname include:

- Hans Hollein (1934–2014), Austrian architect and designer
- Max Hollein (born 1969), Austrian art historian
- Nina Hollein (born 1971), Austrian author, architect, and fashion designer
