= Stijn Alsteens =

Belgian art historian and curator (born 1976)

- Born: 1976 (age 49–50); Leuven, Belgium
- Education: Katholieke Universiteit Leuven, University of Amsterdam
- Occupations: Art historian; curator
- Employer: Fondation Custodia
- Title: Director

Stijn Alsteens (born 1976) is a Belgian art historian and curator, known for his expertise in Dutch and Flemish Old Master drawings. He currently serves as the director of the Fondation Custodia in Paris, overseeing the Frits Lugt Collection.

== Education and career ==
Stijn Alsteens studied Slavic Studies and Art History at the Katholieke Universiteit Leuven and the University of Amsterdam. His career began with internships at the Frits Lugt Collection in the late 1990s, leading to his appointment as a curator at the institution in 2001.

From 2006 to 2016, Alsteens served as the Curator of Northern Drawings at The Metropolitan Museum of Art in New York. During his tenure, he contributed to several significant exhibitions, including those focused on Jan Gossaert (2010), Pieter Coecke van Aelst (2014), and Anthony van Dyck (2016).

In 2016, Alsteens became the International Head of Old Master Drawings at Christie’s in Paris, a role he held until 2023. During this period, he oversaw auctions of significant works, further establishing his reputation as a leading expert in the field.

On 1 April 2023, Alsteens returned to the Frits Lugt Collection as the Director of the Fondation Custodia, where he continues to manage and expand the collection.

== Publications and exhibitions ==
Alsteens has authored numerous publications and has been involved in curating several important exhibitions. Among his notable works are 'Paysages de France dessinés par Lambert Doomer et les artistes hollandais et flamands des XVIe et XVIIe siècles' (2008) and the 2006 exhibition 'Tour de France 1646', co-curated with Hans Buijs. Other exhibitions include:

- Van Dyck: The Anatomy of Portraiture, Frick Collection (2016)
- Grand Design: Pieter Coecke van Aelst and Renaissance Tapestry, Metropolitan Museum of Art (2014)
- Jan Gossaert's Renaissance, The National Gallery (2011)
- Man, Myth, and Sensual Pleasures: Jan Gossart's Renaissance, Metropolitan Museum of Art (2010)
- Tour de France 1646: op reis langs de Loire met Lambert Doomer, Museum Rembrandthuis (2007)
- Regards sur l'art hollandais du XVIIème siècle: Frits Lugt et les frères Dutuit collectionneurs, Fondation Custodia, Frits Lugt Collection (2006)
