= Emilie Gordenker =

American-Dutch art historian and museum director (born 1965)

Emilie E. S. Gordenker
- Born: February 5, 1965 (age 61); Princeton, New Jersey, United States
- Citizenship: United States; Netherlands
- Occupations: Museum director, curator, art historian
- Known for: Museum leadership; seventeenth-century Dutch and Flemish art; Anthony van Dyck; portraiture and the history of dress

Academic background
- Education: Yale University (BA); New York University (MA, PhD)
- Thesis: 'Careless Romance: Van Dyck and Costume in 17th c. Portraiture' (1998)
- Doctoral advisor: Egbert Haverkamp-Begemann

Academic work
- Discipline: Art history
- Sub-discipline: Seventeenth-century Dutch and Flemish art; portraiture; history of dress
- Institutions: Van Gogh Museum; Mauritshuis; National Gallery of Scotland
- Notable works: Anthony van Dyck (1599–1641) and the Representation of Dress in Seventeenth-Century Portraiture (2001)

Emilie Elise Saskia Gordenker (born February 5, 1965 in Princeton, New Jersey) is an American-Dutch art historian and museum director. She is currently the director of the Van Gogh Museum in Amsterdam, a position she has held since February 2020. Gordenker is known for her leadership in the international museum sector, and her innovative approaches to art curation and museum direction.

== Education and early career ==
Gordenker graduated with a B.A. in Russian and East European Studies from Yale University. She later pursued her PhD in Art History at the Institute of Fine Arts, New York University, specializing in 17th-century Dutch and Flemish art, with a focus on the representation of dress in portraits by Anthony van Dyck. Her dissertation, Van Dyck and the Representation of Dress in Seventeenth-Century Portraiture, was published in 2001.

Previously, Gordenker worked at notable institutions like the Metropolitan Museum of Art and the Frick Collection in New York City. She also taught at Rutgers University, Vassar College, and the Bard Graduate Center for Decorative Arts. These experiences helped shape her expertise in both academic and museum environments. She was later appointed curator at the National Gallery of Scotland in Edinburgh after moving from New York to London.

== Leadership at the Mauritshuis ==
Gordenker was appointed director of the Mauritshuis in The Hague in 2007 and took up the position in January 2008, succeeding Frits Duparc. She had previously been senior curator of Early Netherlandish, Dutch and Flemish art at the National Gallery of Scotland in Edinburgh from 2003 to 2007. Her twelve-year tenure included the museum's renovation and expansion, a broader exhibition and research programme, collection development and new digital initiatives.

=== Expansion planning, 2008–2011 ===
During Gordenker's first years as director, plans were developed to overcome the spatial limitations of the seventeenth-century Mauritshuis by incorporating the neighbouring building at Plein 26. In June 2010 the museum presented a preliminary design by architect Hans van Heeswijk. The €22 million Mauritshuis Building for the Future project proposed joining the buildings through an underground foyer and creating spaces for temporary exhibitions, education, lectures and events. Funding came from the Dutch Ministry of Education, Culture and Science, the BankGiro Lottery, private donors and foundations, and income from international touring exhibitions.

The scheme retained the seventeenth-century house as the principal setting for the permanent collection, while the adjoining building accommodated functions for which the historic structure had little space.

=== Closure, international tour and rebuilding, 2012–2014 ===
The Mauritshuis closed for construction in April 2012. During the closure, more than 120 paintings and four sculptures were displayed in a dedicated wing of the Gemeentemuseum Den Haag, including Vermeer's View of Delft, Paulus Potter's The Young Bull and Rembrandt's The Anatomy Lesson of Dr. Nicolaes Tulp. The Prince William V Gallery remained open, while major works from the collection travelled internationally.

The touring programme took paintings including Vermeer's Girl with a Pearl Earring and Carel Fabritius's The Goldfinch to Japan and the United States. The American tour included the de Young Museum in San Francisco, the High Museum of Art in Atlanta and the Frick Collection in New York. The museum reported that the American exhibitions generated revenue and international publicity during the closure.

The completed expansion connected the Mauritshuis with Plein 26 through a large underground entrance foyer beneath the forecourt and street. It approximately doubled the museum's floor area and added a temporary-exhibition gallery, auditorium, education facilities, library and visitor amenities. The historic building received renewed technical installations, lighting and finishes, and a glass lift improved accessibility while preserving sightlines through the entrance hall.

King Willem-Alexander formally reopened the museum on 27 June 2014. From the reopening through the end of 2014 it received more than 330,000 visitors, compared with 261,000 during the full calendar year 2011, the final complete year before construction. During the first twelve months after reopening, attendance exceeded 660,000; the museum recorded 500,476 visitors during calendar year 2015.

The reopening also introduced a new visual identity, website, smartphone application, digitised collection and expanded educational programming. The renovation later received several professional awards, including the Golden Phoenix Award and an International Project Management Award.

=== Exhibitions, research and publishing, 2015–2017 ===
The additional gallery space supported a regular programme of temporary exhibitions alongside the permanent collection. In early 2015, The Frick Collection – Art Treasures from New York presented 36 works from the Frick Collection, then the largest group of works it had lent at one time.

Later that year, Rembrandt? The Case of Saul and David presented the outcome of an eight-year investigation and restoration of Rembrandt's Saul and David. The international research project led by the Mauritshuis supported the painting's full attribution to Rembrandt and established that it had been painted in two phases during the 1650s. Technical investigation also showed that the composition had been cut apart and reconstructed and that its present support incorporates fifteen pieces of canvas. The exhibition used digital interpretation and a three-dimensional reconstruction to present the research to visitors.

In 2016 the Mauritshuis mounted At Home in Holland: Vermeer and His Contemporaries from the British Royal Collection, bringing 22 seventeenth-century Dutch paintings from the Royal Collection to The Hague. The exhibition formed part of a collaboration with the Royal Collection Trust and was accompanied by the catalogue Masters of the Everyday: Dutch Artists in the Age of Vermeer by Desmond Shawe-Taylor and Mauritshuis curator Quentin Buvelot.

The same year, Vik Muniz: Verso became the first exhibition of contemporary art in the Mauritshuis's history. Brazilian artist Vik Muniz produced reconstructions of the reverse sides of famous paintings, including works in the museum's collection.

Scholarly work on the permanent collection continued alongside the exhibitions. In 2016 the museum published Genre Paintings in the Mauritshuis, a collection catalogue by Ariane van Suchtelen and Quentin Buvelot incorporating art-historical, provenance, conservation and technical research.

=== Collection development, conservation and digital projects, 2017–2019 ===
Across Gordenker's directorship, the museum acquired fifteen works, including Roelant Savery's Vase of Flowers in a Stone Niche, Pieter Lastman's St John the Baptist Preaching and Willem Buytewech's Merry Company on a Terrace. The Buytewech, acquired in 2018, is one of six surviving paintings then known by the artist and strengthened the museum's representation of early seventeenth-century Dutch genre painting. Seven works entered or were presented for the collection during 2018, including paintings by Buytewech, Lastman, Daniël Seghers and Jan Cossiers and three allegories by Nicolaes Berchem.

Technical art history also became increasingly visible to visitors. In February and March 2018, The Girl in the Spotlight subjected Vermeer's Girl with a Pearl Earring to intensive scientific examination. A glass-walled studio was constructed inside the museum, where an international team led by Mauritshuis paintings conservator Abbie Vandivere examined the painting in public. Partners included the Rijksmuseum, Delft University of Technology, the University of Amsterdam, the Cultural Heritage Agency of the Netherlands, the University of Antwerp and the National Gallery of Art in Washington.

The museum also expanded its digital activity. In December 2018 the Mauritshuis and Google Arts & Culture launched Meet Vermeer, bringing together high-resolution images of the 36 paintings then generally attributed to Vermeer from 18 museums in seven countries. The project included a Pocket Gallery using augmented reality to assemble the paintings at scale in a virtual exhibition, while the Mauritshuis made its complete collection available in high resolution on the platform.

Research-driven exhibitions in 2018 included Jan Steen's Histories, which examined Jan Steen's history paintings and incorporated technical research into his working methods. In Rogier van der Weyden Unveiled, conservators worked on the Mauritshuis's Lamentation of Christ in a temporary studio within the exhibition space.

=== Rembrandt year and the history of Johan Maurits, 2019 ===
In 2019, marking the 350th anniversary of Rembrandt's death, the Mauritshuis presented Rembrandt and the Mauritshuis. For the first time, all eighteen paintings in the collection then attributed to Rembrandt or historically carrying an attribution to him were displayed together, examining collecting history and changing scholarly opinion alongside the works. Later that year, Nicolaes Maes: Rembrandt's Versatile Pupil became the first international monographic survey of Nicolaes Maes. Organised with the National Gallery in London, it was accompanied by a catalogue by Ariane van Suchtelen, Bart Cornelis, Marijn Schapelhouman and Nina Cahill.

The final phase of Gordenker's directorship also involved reassessing the museum's relationship with Johan Maurits of Nassau-Siegen, the seventeenth-century governor of Dutch Brazil for whom the building is named. A public controversy developed in 2018 around the earlier removal of a modern replica bust of Johan Maurits from the foyer, after which the museum undertook further historical research into his image and the colonial society in which he operated.

Shifting Image – In Search of Johan Maurits, held from April to July 2019, addressed Johan Maurits's governorship of Dutch Brazil, his involvement in the trans-Atlantic slave trade and the changing construction of his reputation. The exhibition incorporated the replica bust and eleven works from the permanent collection connected with Johan Maurits and Dutch Brazil, including Frans Post's View of the Island of Itamaracá in Brazil. The research developed into the museum's longer-term Revisiting Dutch Brazil and Johan Maurits programme.

Gordenker's appointment as general director of the Van Gogh Museum was announced in October 2019. She left the Mauritshuis after twelve years and took up the Amsterdam position on 1 February 2020.

== Director of the Van Gogh Museum ==
In February 2020, Gordenker became director of the Van Gogh Museum in Amsterdam, succeeding Axel Rüger. The Van Gogh Museum is one of the most visited museums in the world, boasting over 2.2 million visitors annually and holding the largest collection of Van Gogh’s works, including more than 200 paintings and 500 drawings.

At the Van Gogh Museum, Gordenker has overseen several important exhibitions, including 'In the Picture', a collection of self-portraits and portraits by Van Gogh and other 19th-century artists, and 'Van Gogh’s Most Beautiful Letters'. She also continues to focus on expanding the museum’s reach and its engagement with visitors, particularly through innovative digital projects.

== Van Gogh Museum Funding ==
In summer 2025, Gordenker publicly warned that the museum faced the risk of closure if the Dutch government did not increase its structural subsidy. At the center of the dispute is the museum's €114 million "Masterplan 2028" for renovations, climate control, fire safety, elevators, and sustainability systems.

The museum requested a €2.9 million increase to its annual subsidy (currently around €10 million) to cover part of the renovation, citing a 1962 agreement obligating the state to ensure the collection’s preservation. The Ministry of Culture rejected the claim, stating that the subsidy follows a national formula and already ranks high per square meter among state museums.

An independent commission confirmed the building's urgent repair needs. With partial closure expected to cost €27 million in lost revenue, the museum filed a legal complaint against the Dutch state. The Van Gogh family, which oversees the Foundation owning the collection, issued a public statement supporting Gordenker and warning the state of its legal obligations.

== Personal life ==
Gordenker is the daughter of Prof. Dr. Leon Gordenker (1923-2020), a professor of political science at Princeton University, and Belia Emilie Strootman (1928-1984). Her maternal grandmother, Emilie Strootman-Engelberts, remarried after the death of her husband to Jan Gerrit van Gelder, the former director of the Mauritshuis from 1945.

In 2008, she married a son of former Dutch banker Wim Scherpenhuijsen Rom. She currently lives in Amsterdam.
