= Hanna Klarenbeek =

Dutch art historian and curator (born 1981)

Hanna Klarenbeek (1981) is a Dutch art historian and curator specialising in nineteenth-century Dutch art, women artists, and works relating to the House of Orange-Nassau. She is curator of paintings, prints and drawings at Het Loo Palace in Apeldoorn.

== Career ==
Klarenbeek studied art history at Utrecht University, where she received her doctorate in 2012. Her dissertation, Penseelprinsessen & broodschilderessen: vrouwen in de beeldende kunst 1808-1913, examined the position of female artists in the Netherlands during the nineteenth century. Before joining Het Loo, she worked for the Netherlands Institute for Art History (RKD) and the Netherlands Institute for Cultural Heritage, and taught art history at Radboud University Nijmegen and the University of Amsterdam.

In 2014 Klarenbeek carried out research into nineteenth-century sculpture in the Netherlands from the Sculpture Institute at Museum Beelden aan Zee, in a project supported by the Rudi Ekkart Fund and the RKD. In April 2015 she succeeded Marieke Spliethoff as curator of paintings, prints and drawings at Het Loo Palace. Among her early work there was the acquisition of a rediscovered double portrait by Gerard van Honthorst depicting Amalia of Solms-Braunfels and Charlotte de La Trémoille.

== Research and publications ==
Klarenbeek's 2006 book Naakt of bloot: Vrouwelijk naakt in de negentiende eeuw examined representations of the female nude in nineteenth-century Dutch art. Her doctoral research substantially expanded the documented history of women artists in the Netherlands. A review in BMGN: Low Countries Historical Review described Penseelprinsessen & broodschilderessen as the first full in-depth study devoted to nineteenth-century women artists in the Netherlands. The research identified 1,107 women artists, with biographical and bibliographical material incorporated into the RKD's online databases.

The research also formed the basis for two exhibitions in 2012 at Het Loo Palace and The Mesdag Collection in The Hague. Penseelprinsessen & broodschilderessen was shortlisted for the 2015 Karel van Mander Prize. The jury stated that Klarenbeek's research filled a gap in art history concerning nineteenth-century women artists and highlighted its combination of scholarly research and public exhibition.

Klarenbeek has subsequently published on women artists including Thérèse Schwartze and Albarta ten Oever, as well as on portraiture and artworks associated with the Orange-Nassau court.

== Selected publications ==
- Naakt of bloot: Vrouwelijk naakt in de negentiende eeuw. Arnhem: Terra Lannoo, 2006. ISBN 90-5897-509-6.
- With Ron Dirven and Saskia de Bodt. Schilders van Dongen. Schiedam: Scriptum Art, 2008. ISBN 978-90-5594-597-9.
- Penseelprinsessen & broodschilderessen: vrouwen in de beeldende kunst 1808-1913. Bussum: Thoth, 2012. ISBN 978-90-6868-588-6.
- With Egge Knol. Albarta ten Oever (1772-1854): Een vrouw in de kunst. Groningen: Groninger Museum, 2017.
- "'High working and high living': The Dutch portraitist Thérèse Schwartze (1851-1918) in Paris". Oud Holland, vol. 133, no. 1, 2020, pp. 33–64.
