= Ariane van Suchtelen =

Dutch curator and art historian (born 1962)

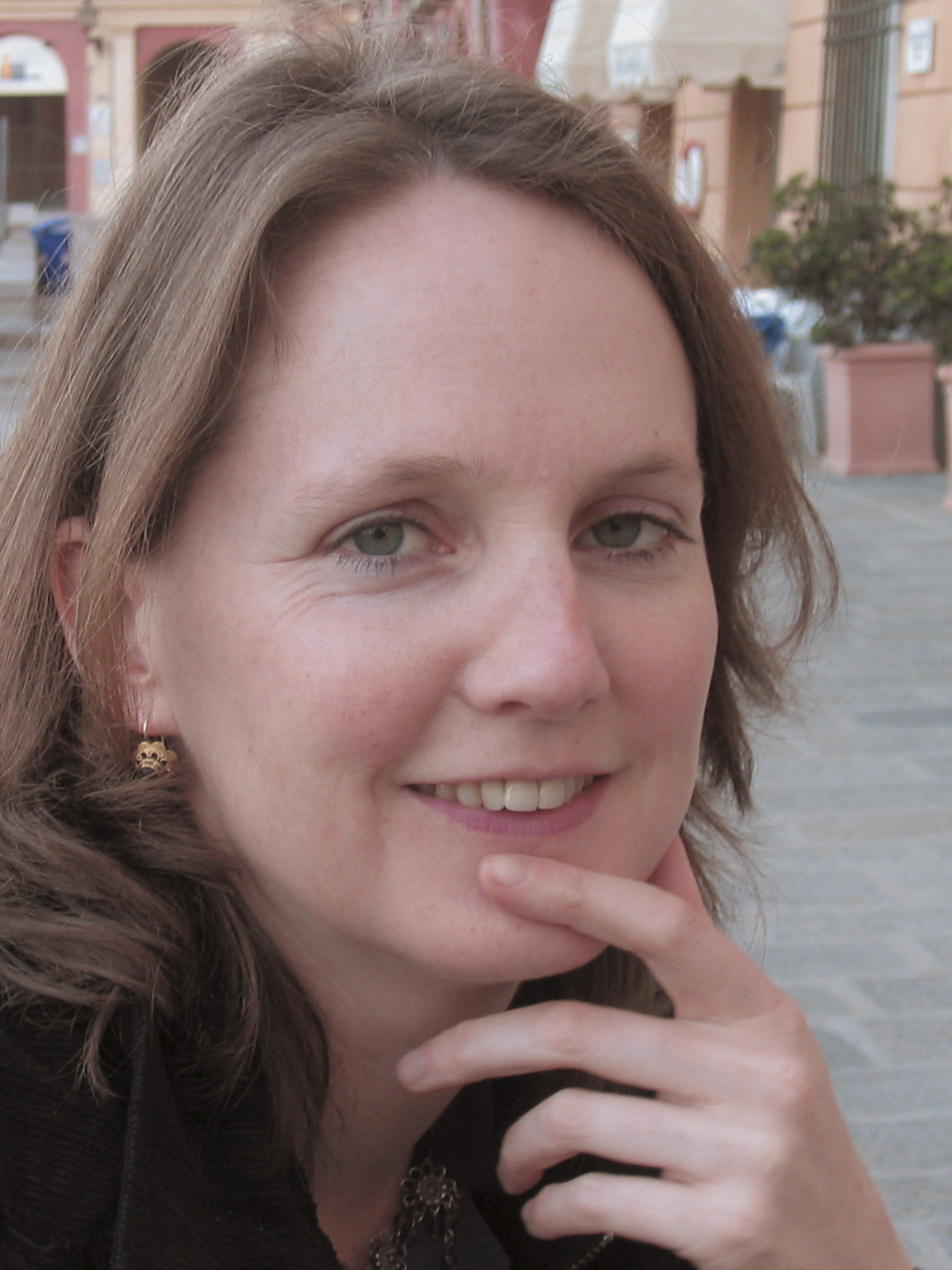
- Ariane van Suchtelen (2005)
- Born: Ariaantje Adriana van Suchtelen; July 12, 1962 (age 64); Hengelo, Overijssel, Netherlands
- Occupation: Art historian

Ariane van Suchtelen (born 12 July 1962, Hengelo, Overijssel) is a Dutch art historian and museum curator at the Mauritshuis in The Hague. She has curated major exhibitions on Dutch and Flemish art, including projects devoted to Nicolaes Maes, Jan Steen, Jan van Scorel, seventeenth-century self-portraiture, and Dutch flower painting.

== Early life and education ==
Van Suchtelen is a member of the noble branch of the Van Suchtelen family and a daughter of jonkheer Mr. Jan Peter van Suchtelen (1916–1997) and Machteld van Hattum (1928), and is the sister of visual artist Anna van Suchtelen.

She studied art history at the University of Groningen.

== Career ==
=== Rijksmuseum and early Mauritshuis career ===
Following her studies, Van Suchtelen spent a year as a graduate intern at the J. Paul Getty Museum in Los Angeles, where she researched the museum's collection of seventeenth-century Dutch paintings. She joined the paintings department of the Rijksmuseum in Amsterdam in 1990, where she worked for five years before moving to the Mauritshuis in The Hague in 1995.

One of her first projects at the Mauritshuis was the major Johannes Vermeer exhibition organized jointly with the National Gallery of Art in Washington in 1995–1996. Van Suchtelen worked on its installation and interpretation and produced a documentary presentation on Vermeer, and published Johannes Vermeer. Mauritshuis, Den Haag in connection with the exhibition.

At the Mauritshuis, Van Suchtelen developed a specialization in sixteenth- and seventeenth-century Dutch and Flemish painting. Over the following decades, her work encompassed collection research, exhibition curation, attribution studies and scholarly publishing.

She has been a member of CODART since 1998.

=== Collection research and publications ===
A substantial part of Van Suchtelen's work has concerned the study and publication of the Mauritshuis collection. In 2004, with Ben Broos, she edited Portraits in the Mauritshuis 1430–1790, a catalogue of the museum's portrait holdings.

Her curatorial work also developed through international collaborations. In 2009, with Arthur K. Wheelock Jr., she organized Pride of Place: Dutch Cityscapes of the Golden Age, shown at the Mauritshuis and the National Gallery of Art in Washington, D.C. Research into groups of works within and beyond the museum collection formed another strand of her scholarship. Her 2013 study of the portraits of the seventeenth-century merchant Willem Craeyvanger and his family led to further research with historian Menno Potjer on the sitters and attribution of the paintings, published in Oud Holland in 2014.

She also authored Genre Paintings in the Mauritshuis (2016), co-edited with Quentin Buvelot. A 2017 scholarly review discussed her catalogue entries on artists including Adriaen Brouwer and Jan Steen.

=== Exhibitions and attribution research ===
Van Suchtelen's exhibitions have frequently developed from research into individual works, artists and genres. Her 2015 exhibition on seventeenth-century Dutch self-portraits, accompanied by the catalogue Dutch Self-Portraits from the Golden Age, brought together works by artists including Rembrandt, Jan Steen, Judith Leyster and Carel Fabritius. The exhibition received international press coverage.

Research for Jan Steen's Histories in 2018 led to one of her more prominent attribution projects. While selecting works for the exhibition, she encountered The Mocking of Samson in the depot of the Royal Museum of Fine Arts Antwerp. The painting had long been regarded as an eighteenth-century copy; restoration and technical examination supported its reattribution to Steen. The same year, she organized an exhibition around the study and cleaning of the Mauritshuis's Lamentation of Christ, attributed to Rogier van der Weyden and his workshop. The project addressed questions of attribution, workshop practice and iconography.

=== Later curatorial work ===
From the early 2020s, Van Suchtelen continued to combine collection scholarship with thematic exhibition-making. Fleeting – Scents in Colour (2021) examined the representation of smell in seventeenth-century painting and incorporated reconstructed historical scents into the gallery experience. This was followed by In Full Bloom (2022), devoted to Dutch and Flemish flower still lifes, the role of women artists, and the relationship between painting, collecting and contemporary interest in botany. Her 2024 exhibition Roelant Savery's Wondrous World examined Roelant Savery through his landscapes, animal studies and work at the Prague court of Emperor Rudolf II.

== Public engagement and media ==
Van Suchtelen has discussed Mauritshuis exhibitions in Dutch broadcast media, including ‘‘Nicolaes Maes – Rembrandt’s Versatile Pupil’’ in 2019 and ‘‘Roelant Savery’s Wondrous World’’ in 2024.

For ‘‘Fleeting – Scents in Colour’’ in 2021, she participated with culinary journalist Joël Broekaert in an interactive digital tour using a scent box to accompany works in the exhibition.

In 2022, ‘‘Den Haag Centraal’’ interviewed Van Suchtelen about ‘‘In Full Bloom’’, including its women flower painters, imagined bouquets combining flowers from different seasons, and themes of transience.

In 2025, she discussed ‘‘The Grand Tour – Destination Italy’’ on the NOS radio programme ‘‘Met het Oog op Morgen’’; ‘‘DutchNews’’ also covered the exhibition and quoted her on the economic network that developed around Grand Tour travellers.

== Exhibitions ==
- Roelant Savery’s Wondrous World – A Versatile Artist (2024)
- In Full Bloom (2022)
- Fleeting – Scents in Colour (2021)
- Nicolaes Maes: Dutch Master of the Golden Age (2020)
- Nicolaes Maes: Rembrandt’s Versatile Pupil (2019–2020)
- Jan Steen’s Histories (2018)
- Jan van Scorel – A Heavenly Discovery (2015–2016)
- Dutch Self-Portraits: Selfies of the Golden Age (2015–2016)
- Room for Art in 17th-Century Antwerp (2009–2010)

== Articles and books ==
- "New Evidence on a Series of Landscape Paintings by Adriaen van de Venne", The J. Paul Getty Museum Journal (1990).
- (exhibition booklet) Johannes Vermeer: Mauritshuis, Den Haag. The Hague: Mauritshuis, 1996.
- "De aanbidding der herders door J. de Bray", Mauritshuis in Focus (1997).
- (editor and co-author, with Yvette Bruijnen and Edwin Buijsen) Kunst op vleugels: Rond een herenigd drieluik van Gerard David. The Hague/Bussum: Mauritshuis/V+K Publishing, 1997. ISBN 978-90-6611-821-8.
- Winters van weleer: Het Hollandse winterlandschap in de Gouden Eeuw. The Hague/Zwolle: Mauritshuis/Waanders, 2001. ISBN 90-400-9574-4 (hardback); ISBN 90-400-9573-6 (paperback).
- (catalogue contributor) Hans Holbein de Jonge, 1497/98–1543: Portretschilder van de Renaissance. The Hague/Zwolle: Mauritshuis/Waanders, 2003. ISBN 978-90-400-8795-0.
- (contributor; catalogue by Frederik J. Duparc, with Gero Seelig) Carel Fabritius, 1622–1654. The Hague/Zwolle: Mauritshuis/Waanders, 2004.
- (co-author, with Anne T. Woollett) Rubens & Brueghel: een artistieke vriendschap. Los Angeles/The Hague/Zwolle: J. Paul Getty Museum/Mauritshuis/Waanders, 2006. ISBN 978-90-400-8285-6.
- (co-author, with Epco Runia) Rembrandt in het Mauritshuis. The Hague/Zwolle: Mauritshuis/Waanders, 2006. ISBN 978-90-400-8174-3.
- (co-editor and co-author, with Arthur K. Wheelock Jr.) Dutch Cityscapes of the Golden Age. The Hague/Washington, D.C./Zwolle: Mauritshuis/National Gallery of Art/Waanders, 2008. ISBN 978-90-400-8461-4 (hardback); ISBN 978-90-400-8460-7 (paperback).
- (co-author, with Ben van Beneden) Kamers vol kunst in zeventiende-eeuws Antwerpen. Antwerp/The Hague/Zwolle: Rubenshuis/Mauritshuis/Waanders, 2009. ISBN 978-90-400-8639-7.
- “Hendrick Avercamp – De meester van het ijsgezicht”, Oud Holland (2011).
- Jan Steen. In het Mauritshuis. The Hague/Zwolle: Mauritshuis/Waanders, 2011. ISBN 978-90-400-7762-3.
- (exhibition brochure) De hele familie Craeyvanger = The entire Craeyvanger family. Maastricht: Bonnefantenmuseum, 2013.
- “De Arnhemse familie Craeyvanger – een bijzondere groep portretten door Paulus Lesire, Gerard ter Borch en Caspar Netscher”, Oud Holland (2014).
- Hollandse zelfportretten uit de Gouden Eeuw. The Hague/Zwolle: Mauritshuis/Waanders, 2015. ISBN 978-94-6262-055-1.
- De doop van Christus: Jan van Scorel in Haarlem. Haarlem: Frans Hals Museum, 2015. ISBN 978-94-90198-17-6.
- (co-author, with Quentin Buvelot) Genre Paintings in the Mauritshuis. The Hague/Zwolle: Mauritshuis/Waanders, 2016. ISBN 978-94-6262-094-0.
- Jan Steen en de historieschilderkunst. The Hague/Zwolle: Mauritshuis/Waanders, 2018. ISBN 978-94-6262-165-7.
- The Grand Tour: Destination Italy. Zwolle: Waanders Publishers, 2025. ISBN 9789462626461.
