= Janneke van Asperen =

Dutch art historian and curator

- Occupations: Art historian, curator
- Employer: Museum De Lakenhal
- Known for: Curatorial work on early modern Dutch art

Janneke van Asperen is a Dutch art historian and museum curator. She is curator of old masters at Museum De Lakenhal in Leiden.

== Career ==
Van Asperen studied art history at the University of Amsterdam, The New School in New York, and the Courtauld Institute of Art in London. She specialized in early modern visual art and worked in the art trade, at the Prins Bernhard Cultuurfonds, and at the Rijksmuseum.

She joined Museum De Lakenhal in 2020 as junior curator and became curator of old masters in 2021. In that role, she became responsible for the museum’s collection of old master paintings and sculpture.

Van Asperen is a member of CODART.

== Curatorial work ==
Van Asperen served as curator of Rembrandts vier zintuigen – Zijn eerste schilderijen, a 2024 presentation at Museum De Lakenhal that brought together four of Rembrandt’s earliest known paintings in Leiden. Interviews with her about the presentation discussed the missing fifth work in the series, associated with taste, and on the paintings—as evidence of Rembrandt’s early experimentation with broad brushwork and chiaroscuro.

She has also been associated with collection research and acquisitions at Museum De Lakenhal. The local Leiden-based Leidsch Dagblad linked her to the museum’s 2021 acquisition of the painting known as Tweelingzussen, by Jan van Mieris.

In 2025, Van Asperen was involved in the research project behind the exhibition Master I.S. – The Enigmatic Contemporary of Rembrandt, presented at Serlachius in collaboration with Museum De Lakenhal, with Tomi Moisio and in collaboration with Volker Manuth, Marieke de Winkel, and David de Witt.

In 2026, Van Asperen and Lea van der Vinde co-curated At Home with Jan Steen – 400 Years of Merrymaking, examining Jan Steen through his family, professional circle, and connections with Leiden.

== Publications ==
Van Asperen is co-editor of:

- (with Tomi Moisio), Master I.S. – Enigmatic Contemporary of Rembrandt (2025)
- David Bailly – Time, Death and Vanity with Christiaan Vogelaar and Rudi Ekkart.
