= Pauline Suij =

Dutch painter

Pauline Suij (23 May 1863, Amersfoort – 25 September 1949, Amsterdam) was an artist who attended the Royal Academy of Art, The Hague. She belongs to the second generation of the Hague School and of Amsterdam Impressionism. She was a member of the second of these two Dutch movements of Impressionism.

== Life and work ==
At the age of 23 Suij had already begun to work as a painter. Four years later she was admitted to the ladies class of the Royal Academy of Art, The Hague. There she studied from 1882 until 1884. In Amsterdam she was a private pupil of Hendrik Johannes Havermann, John Gijsbert Vogel and Jan Hillebrand Wijsmuller.

Until 1889, she had a studio in Amersfoort. Then she went to Amsterdam. Her work was influenced by the environment of the school of Allebé and the flow of the Amsterdam Impressionism and her private lessons. Her genre was landscape painting, and although the city face. From the aspiring, prosperous metropolis Amsterdam substantial influence went on many young painters. The motives were almost inexhaustible. She used the art of drawing and oil painting.

She was a member of the Art Society Arti et Amicitiae (short popularly: Arti).

== Exhibitions ==
- 30.05.-18.08.2012, Apeldoorn, collective exhibition - Penseelprinsessen I Kunstenaressen aan en rond het hof.
- 18.02.-27.05.2012, The Hague, collective exhibition - Penseelprinsessen II, Schilderen as beroep

== Bibliography ==
=== Books ===
- Hanna Klarenbeek: Penseelprinsessen en broodschilderessen: Vrouwen in de beeldende art from 1808 to 1913. Uitgeverij Thoth, 2012 ISBN 978-90-6868-588-6.
- Victorine Hefting: Johan Barthold Jongkind, sa vie, son oeuvre, son époque. Publishing Arts et Métiers Graphiques, Paris 1975 OCLC 251 469 312.
- Georges Pillement: Les Pré-Impressionistes train 1972 OCLC 251 779 014.
- Norma Broude: Impressionism - an international movement from 1860 to 1920. Dumond Verlag Cologne 1990 ISBN 3-8321-7454-0.
- Freda Constable: John Constable, A Biography, 1776–1837. Lavenham, Dalton 1975. ISBN 0-900963-54-9.
- Patrick Noon: . John Parker Bonington - On the Pleasure of Painting Balding + Mansell, 1991, ISBN 0-300-05108-5.
- John Sillevis, Hans Kraan, Roland Dorn: The Hague School, masterpieces of Dutch painting of the 19th century from Haags Gemeentemuseum, exh. Kunsthalle Mannheim. Edition Braus, 1987, ISBN 3-925835-08-3.

=== Magazines ===
- Joop Versteegle: De Tachtiger signs HJHoverman (1857–1928). In Art en Antiekjourneel. Maart of 2008.

=== Archive of Rijksacademie to Amsterdam ===
- Scheen 1969–1970
- Scheen 1981, p 506 (as: Suij, Pauline)
- Klaarenbeek 2012 S. 212th
