= Institut Néerlandais =

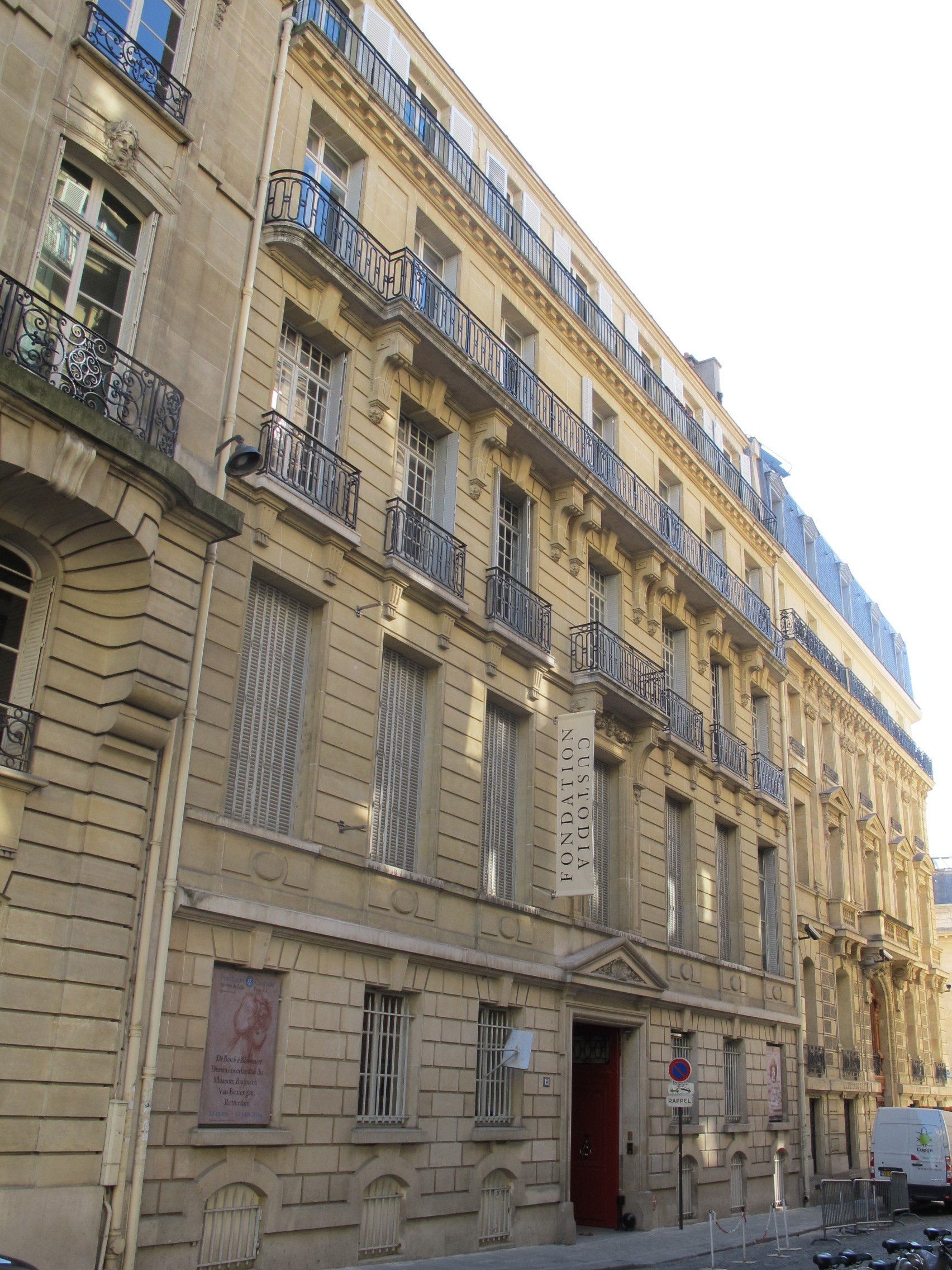
- Focus: promotion of Dutch art and culture
- Location: Paris, France
- Coordinates: 48.8613°N 2.3197°E
- Website: http://www.institutneerlandais.com
- Dissolved: December 2013

The Institut Néerlandais (1957–2013) was a non-profit institution in Paris devoted to the promotion of Dutch art and culture. One of the earliest foreign cultural centers in Paris, it was founded in 1957 by Frits Lugt. The Dutch Ministry of Foreign Affairs, the sole financier of the center announced its closure in 2013. It closed in December 2013. Located at 121 rue de Lille, it occupied the Hôtel Turgot, an 18th-century mansion.

The owner of the building, another foundation started by Frits Lugt, adjoins and currently uses the building as a gallery for the collection of the Fondation Custodia.

== See also ==
- List of foreign cultural institutes in Paris
