= Ian Wardropper =

American art historian, curator, and museum director (born 1951)

- Born: May 11, 1951 (age 74); Baltimore, Maryland
- Education: Brown University; New York University
- Occupation: Art curator
- Employer: Frick Collection
- Title: Director

Ian Bruce Wardropper (born 1951) is an American art historian and curator, known for his expertise in European sculpture, decorative arts, and Old Master paintings. He has been the director of the Frick Collection in New York City since 2011.

== Early life and education ==
Wardropper was born on May 11, 1951, in Baltimore, Maryland, where he was raised. Wardropper received his Bachelor of Arts from Brown University in 1973, concentrating in art. He then pursued graduate studies at New York University, where he earned a Master of Arts in 1976 and a PhD in 1985.

== Career ==
Wardropper began his curatorial career at the Art Institute of Chicago, where he was Assistant Curator of European Sculpture from 1982 to 1985. He was then associate curator of European decorative arts and sculpture, a role he held until 1989. From 1989 to 2001, he was the Eloise W. Martin Curator of European Decorative Arts and Sculpture, and Classical Art at the Art Institute.

In 2001, Wardropper joined The Metropolitan Museum of Art in New York City as the Iris and B. Gerald Cantor Curator in Charge of European Sculpture and Decorative Arts. He was promoted to chairman of the department in 2005, a position he held until his departure in 2011.

In 2013 Wardropper was invested with the Order of Arts and Letters from France in a ceremony held at the Art Institute of Chicago, for recognition of his contributions to the appreciation of European art; especially his role in advancing French culture through curated exhibitions and fostering partnerships with major museums across the United States.

== The Frick Collection ==
In 2011, Wardropper was appointed director of the Frick Collection, where he has overseen significant exhibitions, publications, and acquisitions, as well as the major renovation, and expansion project known as "Frick Madison."

Under his leadership, the Frick Collection expanded its international activities, securing loans and lending works to exhibitions around the world, and hosting numerous international symposiums themed around topics related to works in the collection.

The renovation and expansion of the Frick Collection's main building entailed creating new spaces for exhibitions, as well as dedicated spaces for educational and conservation initiatives, and was designed by the architecture firm Selldorf Architects.

Wardropper announced that he would be stepping down as director of the museum, in 2025.

Max Hollein, director of the Metropolitan Museum of Art, has commented on Wardropper's work at the Frick, stating that: “He opened up a dialogue with contemporary thinkers and cultural figures. The Frick could be perceived as a very static collection. I think Ian changed that.”

== Selected publications ==
- The Sleeve Should Be Illegal & Other Reflections on Art at the Frick. New York: The Frick Collection, 2016.
- Limoges Enamels at the Frick Collection. New York: The Frick Collection, 2015.
- European Sculpture, 1400-1900: in The Metropolitan Museum of Art. New York: The Metropolitan Museum of Art, 2011.
