= Rudi Ekkart =

Dutch art historian and curator (born 1947)

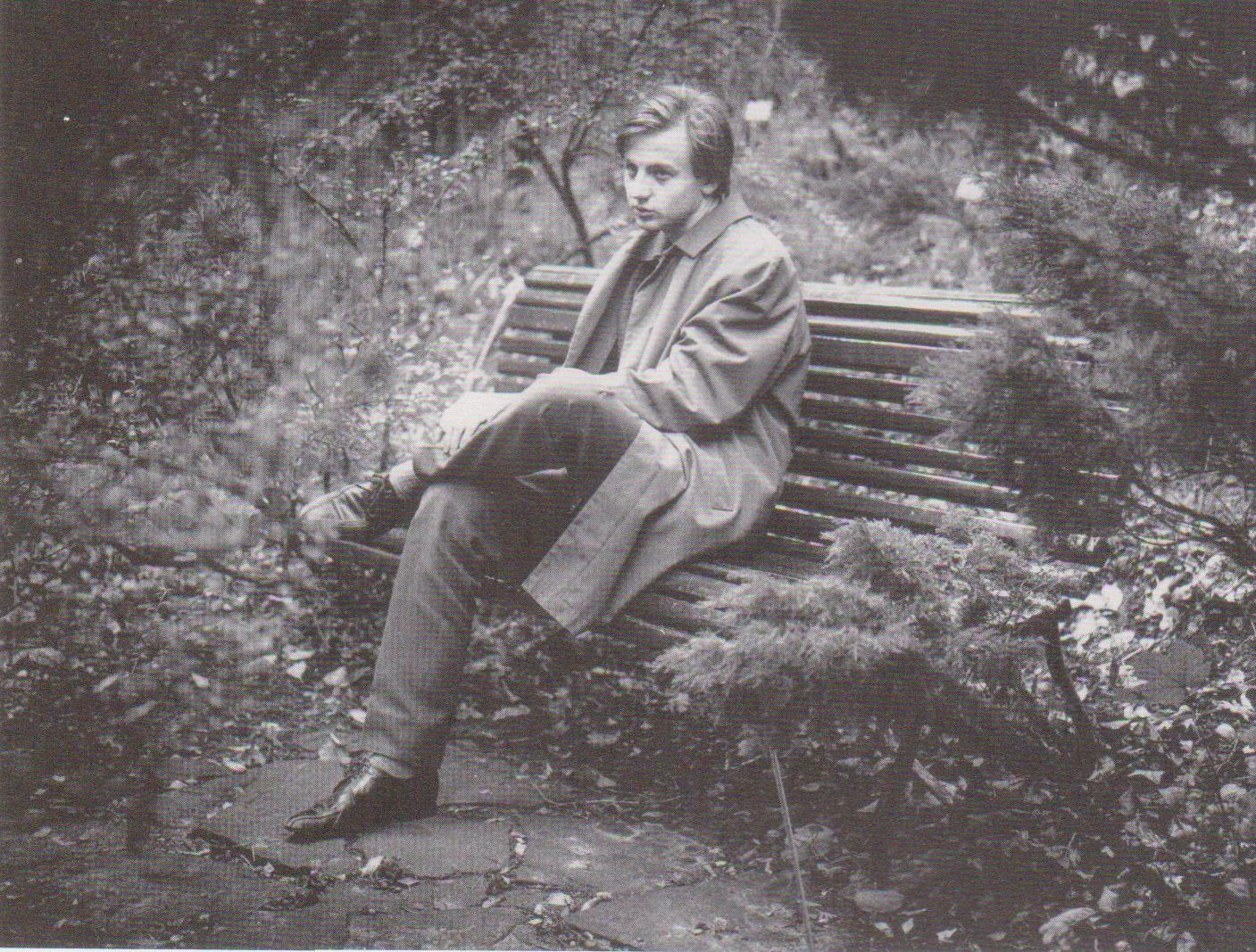
- Ekkart in 1973
- Born: Rudolf Erik Otto Ekkart; 23 December 1947 (age 78); The Hague, Netherlands
- Known for: Scholarship on Dutch portraiture; director of the RKD; Dutch art-restitution policy; Ekkart Committee; provenance research, Dutch Golden Age painting research

Academic background
- Education: Leiden University, University of Amsterdam
- Thesis: 'Portrettisten en portretten: studies over portretkunst in Holland, 1575–1650' (1997)
- Doctoral advisor: Ernst van de Wetering

Academic work
- Institutions: Netherlands Institute for Art History; Utrecht University
- Notable works: Dutch Portraits: The Age of Rembrandt and Frans Hals; Looted Art & Restitution

Rudolf Erik Otto "Rudi" Ekkart (born 23 December 1947) is a Dutch art historian, curator, museum director, professor, and provenance researcher.

He is known for his scholarship on Dutch and Flemish portraiture, especially portraiture in Holland between the late sixteenth and mid-seventeenth centuries, and for his role in Dutch provenance research and art-restitution policy after the Second World War.

From 1990 to 2012, he served as director of the Netherlands Institute for Art History (RKD), where his work connected connoisseurship, archival documentation, museum research, and the systematic study of Dutch and Flemish art.

== Early life and education ==
Ekkart was born in The Hague on 23 December 1947. He studied art history and archaeology at Leiden University. In 1997, he received his doctorate from the University of Amsterdam with the dissertation Portrettisten en portretten: studies over portretkunst in Holland, 1575–1650, supervised by Ernst van de Wetering.

== Museum and academic career ==
After his studies, Ekkart worked at the Academisch Historisch Museum in Leiden and at the Rijksmuseum Meermanno-Westreenianum / Museum van het Boek in The Hague. He joined the Netherlands Institute for Art History as deputy director in 1987 and became director in 1990, leading the RKD until his retirement in 2012.

In 2004, Ekkart was appointed professor of methodological aspects of art-historical documentation at Utrecht University, a chair that reflected the RKD's central role in attribution, documentation, image archives, and the research infrastructure of Dutch art history. His inaugural lecture, delivered in 2005, was titled Kwesties van vraag en antwoord.

Ekkart also served on numerous Dutch and international cultural, scholarly, and museum boards, including bodies connected with art-historical publishing, museum policy, digital heritage, university collections, the Mondriaan Foundation, the Vereniging Rembrandt, and the Research Institutes in the History of Art.

== Scholarship on Dutch portraiture ==
Ekkart's scholarship has centered on portraiture in the Low Countries, with particular attention to attribution, likeness, inscriptions, social function, and the documentary value of portraits as historical evidence. His dissertation examined portrait painters and portraiture in Holland from 1575 to 1650, a period central to the development of portraiture before and during the Dutch Golden Age.

With Quentin Buvelot, Ekkart co-authored Dutch Portraits: The Age of Rembrandt and Frans Hals, published in connection with the 2007–2008 exhibition at the National Gallery in London and the Mauritshuis in The Hague. The exhibition brought together sixty-six examples of seventeenth-century Dutch portraiture and was reviewed as one of several major studies that expanded scholarly attention to Dutch portraiture as a distinct historical and artistic field.

He has also published on individual portraitists and draftsmen, including Johannes Thopas, the seventeenth-century deaf draughtsman whose portrait drawings were the subject of Ekkart's study Deaf, Dumb and Brilliant: Johannes Thopas, Master Draughtsman. CODART lists his later publications on subjects including Rembrandt's portrait commissions, Govert Flinck, Ferdinand Bol, Aert Schouman, and Johann Friedrich August Tischbein, showing the range of his work across portraiture, court culture, museum catalogues, and exhibition scholarship.

In 2012, the Dordrechts Museum, in collaboration with the RKD, organized Portret in portret in de Nederlandse kunst in honor of Ekkart's retirement from the RKD. CODART described Ekkart as a prominent specialist in portraiture and identified Dutch portraiture from the sixteenth century to the present as his central field of study.

== Provenance research and restitution ==
Ekkart has been a central figure in Dutch provenance research concerning artworks looted, confiscated, sold under duress, or displaced during the Second World War. From 1997 to 2004, he chaired the Origins Unknown Committee, widely known as the Ekkart Committee, which supervised research into the provenance of the Netherlands Art Property Collection, or NK Collection. The NK Collection consisted of roughly 4,000 objects, including paintings, works on paper, furniture, ceramics, and other objects that had been confiscated during the war, recovered from Germany, and remained in Dutch state custody.

The Ekkart Committee also investigated the postwar work of the Netherlands Art Property Foundation, or Stichting Nederlands Kunstbezit (SNK), which had been responsible between 1945 and 1952 for the recovery and restitution of cultural property. Its recommendations helped reshape Dutch restitution policy by urging systematic provenance research, claimant-sensitive standards of evidence, and a broader understanding of forced sales by Jewish owners during the Nazi period.

The committee recommended that sales by Jewish private persons in the Netherlands from 10 May 1940 onward be treated as forced sales unless express evidence showed otherwise, and that claimants receive the benefit of the doubt where the wartime record was incomplete. One of its recommendations concerned the establishment of a separate Restitutions Committee to handle individual restitution requests; the Dutch Restitutions Committee was established in late 2001. Later restitution cases continued to cite the Ekkart Committee's recommendations, including its standard that title to a claimed work could be accepted when proved with a high degree of probability and without indications to the contrary.

Ekkart later chaired the independent supervisory committee overseeing renewed provenance research into NK Collection objects at the Cultural Heritage Agency of the Netherlands. The agency described the committee's role as monitoring the quality of past and future provenance research and assessing whether research standards were sufficient to determine object histories as accurately as possible.

In 2023, Ekkart and Eelke Muller published Looted Art & Restitution: The Exodus and Partial Return of Dutch Art Property During and After World War II, a study of the wartime removal, postwar recovery, and partial restitution of Dutch art property.

== Authentication and art-historical method ==
Ekkart's work also extended into the field of art authentication, where questions of attribution, documentation, provenance, technical research, and legal responsibility converge. In 2012, he and Milko den Leeuw founded the Authentication in Art Foundation, which brought together specialists from art history, conservation, material science, the art market, and art law to address developments in authentication practice.

== Honors ==
In 2023, Ekkart was made an honorary member of the Association for Dutch Art Historians.

== Major publications ==
=== 1975 ===
- Ekkart, R.E.O., introduction. Athenae Batavae: De Leidse Universiteit / The University of Leiden, 1575–1975. Leiden: Universitaire Pers Leiden, 1975. ISBN 9060212223.

=== 1977 ===
- Ekkart, Rudi. Franeker professorenportretten: Iconografie van de professoren aan de Academie en het Rijksathenaeum te Franeker, 1585–1843. Franeker: Wever, 1977. ISBN 9061352630.

=== 1979 ===
- Ekkart, Rudi. Johannes Cornelisz. Verspronck: Leven en werken van een Haarlems portretschilder uit de 17de eeuw. Haarlem: Frans Halsmuseum, 1979.

=== 1985 ===
- Ekkart, Rudi. De Rijmbijbel van Jacob van Maerlant: Een in 1332 voltooid handschrift uit het Rijksmuseum Meermanno-Westreenianum. The Hague: Staatsuitgeverij, 1985. ISBN 9012048664.

=== 1987 ===
- Ekkart, Rudi. Vroege boekdrukkunst uit Italië: Italiaanse incunabelen uit het Rijksmuseum Meermanno-Westreenianum. The Hague: Staatsuitgeverij, 1987. ISBN 9012055962.
- Ekkart, Rudi. Catalogus van de schilderijen in het Rijksmuseum Meermanno-Westreenianum. The Hague: Rijksmuseum Meermanno-Westreenianum, 1987. ISBN 9012056985.

=== 1988 ===
- Ekkart, Rudi. John Buckland Wright 1897–1954, boekillustrator: Een overzicht van het materiaal rond de boekillustraties van John Buckland Wright in het Museum van het Boek. The Hague: Rijksmuseum Meermanno-Westreenianum, 1988.

=== 1991 ===
- Ekkart, Rudi. Knappe koppen: Vier eeuwen Nederlands professorenportret. Utrecht: Centraal Museum, 1991. ISBN 9060117638.

=== 1992 ===
- Ekkart, Rudi. Een boekmuseum verzamelt: Aanwinsten 1987–1991 verworven tijdens het directoraat van dr. J. Offerhaus. The Hague: Rijksmuseum Meermanno-Westreenianum / Museum van het Boek, 1992. ISBN 9060117956.

=== 1995 ===
- Ekkart, Rudi. Nederlandse portretten uit de 17e eeuw: Eigen collectie / Dutch Portraits from the Seventeenth Century: Own Collection. Rotterdam: Museum Boijmans Van Beuningen, 1995. ISBN 9069181401.

=== 1997 ===
- Ekkart, Rudi. Portrettisten en portretten: Studies over portretkunst in Holland, 1575–1650. PhD dissertation, University of Amsterdam, 1997.

=== 1998 ===
- Ekkart, Rudi. Isaac Claesz. van Swanenburg, 1537–1614: Leids schilder en burgemeester. Zwolle: Waanders, 1998. ISBN 9040092826.

=== 1999 ===
- Ekkart, Rudi. Spinoza in beeld: Het onbekende gezicht / Spinoza in Portrait: The Unknown Face. Voorschoten: Vereniging Het Spinozahuis, 1999.

=== 2005 ===
- Ekkart, Rudi. Kwesties van vraag en antwoord. Utrecht and Zwolle: Utrecht University / Waanders, 2005. ISBN 9789040088223.

=== 2006 ===
- Ekkart, Rudi. Herkomst gezocht: Eindrapportage Commissie Ekkart / Origins Unknown: Final Report Ekkart Committee. Zwolle: Waanders, 2006. ISBN 9789040083488.
- Ekkart, Rudi. Tibout Regters 1710–1768: Schilder van portretten en conversatiestukken. Leiden: Primavera Pers, 2006. ISBN 9059970322.

=== 2007 ===
- Ekkart, Rudi; Buvelot, Quentin, eds. Dutch Portraits: The Age of Rembrandt and Frans Hals. Zwolle: Waanders Publishers, 2007. Dutch edition: Hollanders in beeld: Portretten uit de Gouden Eeuw. ISBN 9789040083341.

=== 2009 ===
- Ekkart, Rudi. Johannes Verspronck and the Girl in Blue. Amsterdam: Rijksmuseum / Nieuw Amsterdam, 2009. ISBN 9789086890538.

=== 2011 ===
- Ekkart, Rudi. Dutch and Flemish Portraits 1600–1800: Holland és flamand 17–18. századi arcképek. Old Masters’ Gallery Catalogues, Szépművészeti Múzeum Budapest, vol. 1. Leiden: Primavera Press; Budapest: Szépművészeti Múzeum, 2011. ISBN 9789059971004.

=== 2014 ===
- Ekkart, Rudi; Schretlen, Helen C.M. Museale verwervingen vanaf 1933: Herkomstonderzoek naar museale collecties in verband met roof, confiscatie of gedwongen verkoop in de periode 1933–1945 / Investigation into the Provenance of Museum Collections in Connection with the Theft, Confiscation and Sale of Objects under Duress between 1933 and 1945. Amsterdam: Museumvereniging, 2014.
- Ekkart, Rudi. Deaf, Dumb & Brilliant: Johannes Thopas, Master Draughtsman. London: Paul Holberton Publishing, 2014. ISBN 9781907372674.

=== 2015 ===
- Ekkart, Rudi; van den Donk, Claire. Van Bol tot Veth: De portretverzameling van de families Van de Poll, Wolters en Quina. Leiden: Primavera Pers, 2015. ISBN 9789059972148.

=== 2017 ===
- Ekkart, Rudi; Muller, Eelke. Roof en restitutie: De uittocht en gedeeltelijke terugkeer van Nederlands kunstbezit tijdens en na de Tweede Wereldoorlog. Deventer: Ter Borch Stichting, 2017. ISBN 9789082675207.

=== 2018 ===
- Ekkart, Rudi; van den Donk, Claire. Lief en Leed: Realisme en fantasie in Nederlandse familiegroepen uit de zeventiende en achttiende eeuw. Zwolle: Waanders Uitgevers, 2018. ISBN 9789462621930.

=== 2023 ===
- Ekkart, Rudi; Muller, Eelke. Looted Art & Restitution: The Exodus and Partial Return of Dutch Art Property During and After World War II. Zwolle: Waanders Publishers, 2023. ISBN 9789462624986.
- van Asperen, Janneke; Vogelaar, Christiaan; Ekkart, Rudi. David Bailly: Time, Death and Vanity. Zwolle: Waanders Publishers / Leiden: Museum De Lakenhal, 2023. ISBN 9789462624634.

=== 2024 ===
- Ekkart, Rudi; van den Donk, Claire. Johann George Schwartze: Uit de schaduw van zijn dochter. Zwolle: WBOOKS, 2024. ISBN 9789462586598.
- Ekkart, Rudi; van den Donk, Claire. Wallerant Vaillant in Amsterdam. Zwolle: WBOOKS, 2024. ISBN 9789462586420.
- Middelkoop, Norbert E.; Ekkart, Rudi E.O., eds. Frans Hals: Iconography – Technique – Reputation. Amsterdam: Amsterdam University Press, 2024. ISBN 9789048566068.

=== 2025 ===
- Ekkart, Rudi; van den Donk, Claire. Mijn man zaligers liefhebberije: Portretten en schilderijen in het Hofje van Mevrouw van Aerden in Leerdam. Zwolle: WBOOKS, 2025. ISBN 9789462587281.
