= Charlotte Rulkens =

Dutch art historian and curator (born 1991)

- Born: 1991 (age 34–35); Netherlands
- Education: Leiden University, University of Amsterdam, Vrije Universiteit (PhD)
- Occupations: Art historian, Curator, Researcher

Charlotte Rulkens (born 1991) is a Dutch art historian, researcher, curator, and technical art historian. She specializes in seventeenth-century Dutch art, particularly Rembrandt, painting techniques, and attribution research. Her research also includes sixteenth-century Flemish still life painting.

== Career ==
=== Education ===
Rulkens studied art history at the University of Amsterdam, where she received her BA in Art History and MA in Curating Arts and Cultures, and later obtained her PhD at the Vrije Universiteit, in 2026.

=== Curatorial work ===
Rulkens held early curatorial and research positions at the Rijksmuseum, The Frick Collection in New York, and the Mauritshuis in The Hague.

At the Mauritshuis, Rulkens contributed to exhibitions including Slow Food: Still Lifes of the Golden Age, and National Trust: Dutch Masters from British Country Houses, and curated Rembrandt and the Mauritshuis, organized for the Rembrandt Year in 2019. Her work at the museum included research on Rembrandt, the history of the Mauritshuis collection, and the changing reception of Rembrandt within the institution. During her time at the Mauritshuis she also played a key role in the renewal of the Prince William V Gallery, and has been involved in initiatives to engage young professionals in museum governance and decision-making processes in the Netherlands.

=== Academic work ===
Rulkens is a research associate at Vrije Universiteit Amsterdam, where her work formed part of the project Replicating a Rembrandt Study. The project examined the possibilities and limits of replication in art history, using attribution research on portraits associated with the young Rembrandt as a case study.

In 2026, she defended her doctoral dissertation, Rembrandt and Rubens Revisited: Towards more Transparent and Replicable Attributions, at Vrije Universiteit Amsterdam. Her dissertation proposed the Attribution Expert Consensus Meeting as a method for making attribution research in art history more transparent, collaborative, and replicable.

=== Board membership ===
Since 2023, Rulkens has served on the supervisory board of the Rembrandt House Museum.

== Publications ==
- ‘De Amsterdamse mathematicus Jan van den Dam (1706-1770) en zijn vernuftige planetaria’, Jaarboek van het Genootschap Amstelodamum (with Huib J. Zuidervaart), vol. 106, 2014, pp. 120–163.
- with Quentin Buvelot and Desmond Shawe-Taylor: Masters of the Everyday: Dutch Artists in the Age of Vermeer. Exhibition catalog, Mauritshuis, The Hague; Queen’s Gallery, Buckingham Palace, London; and Queen’s Gallery, Palace of Holyroodhouse, Edinburgh, Royal Collection Trust, London, 2015, ISBN 978-1-909741-19-5.
- with Quentin Buvelot, Yvonne Bleyerveld, Milou Goverde, Zoran Kwak, Anne Lenders and Fred G. Meijer: Slow Food. Dutch and Flemish Meal Still Lifes, 1600-1640. Exhibition catalog, Mauritshuis, The Hague/Waanders, Zwolle, 2017, ISBN 978-94-6262-117-6.
- Rembrandt en het Mauritshuis. Exhibition catalog, Mauritshuis, The Hague/Waanders, Zwolle, 2019, ISBN 9789462622135.
- “Expert Consensus Methods In The Humanities: An Exploration of their Potential”, F1000Research (with Rik Peels, Lidwine B. Mokkink, Tamarinde L. Haven and Lex M. Bouter), vol. 13, 2024, pp. 1–40.
- “Replication studies in the Netherlands: Lessons learned and recommendations for funders, publishers and editors, and universities”, Accountability in Research (with Maarten Derksen et al.), vol. 32, issue 7, 2025, pp. 1285–1303.
