= Nina Hollein =

Austrian architect, artist, author and fashion designer

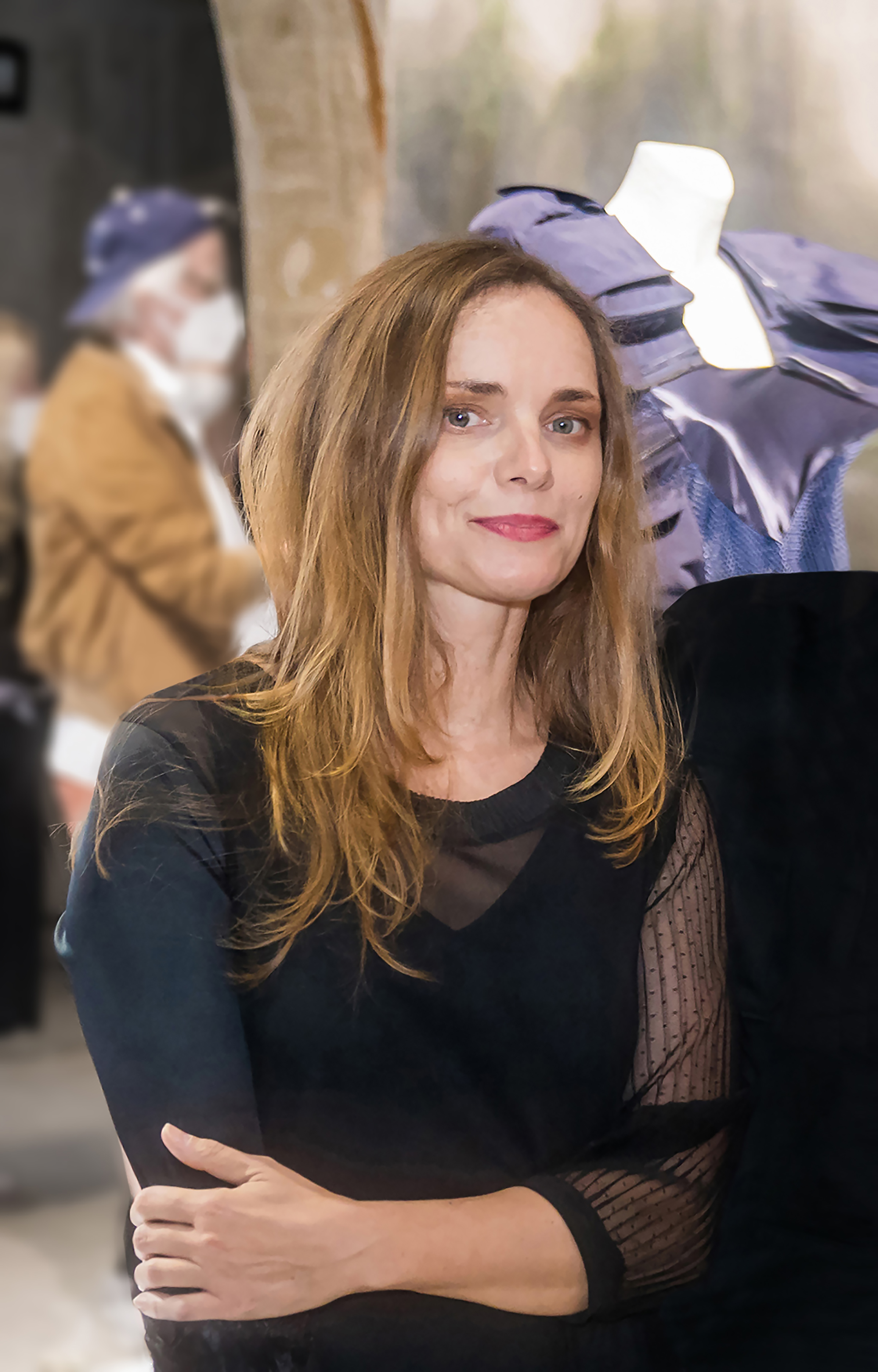
Nina Hollein at the Vernissage of Palindrome in Frankfurt (July 2021)

Nina Hollein (9 February 1971, Vienna) is an Austrian artist, author, architect, and fashion designer based in New York City.

== Life ==
Hollein, the daughter of a designer and a classical philologist, grew up in Vienna and Linz. Her interest in architecture and design developed at an early age, inspired by her uncles Laurids Ortner and Manfred Ortner of the Austrian architect and artist group Haus-Rucker-Co. After her high school Matura, Hollein studied architecture at the Vienna University of Technology and graduated with a Master of Science degree. In 1996, she received a scholarship from the Austrian Federal Chancellery and moved to New York. While there, she worked in the offices of Peter Eisenman and Tod Williams Billie Tsien Architects. In 2001, she and her husband Max Hollein moved to Frankfurt. In Frankfurt, she joined the office of the architect and urban planner Albert Speer. After the birth of her first child, Hollein worked as a book author and wrote reviews and essays for children's books. In addition, Hollein worked as a writer for the Frankfurter Allgemeine Zeitung and the German lifestyle magazine Prinz. In 2009, Hollein founded her own fashion label for women and children. For her first collection, she received the award of the Frankfurt Fashion Fair "Stilblüte".

== Publications ==
=== Books ===
- Cut-Out Fun with Matisse, Prestel Verlag München, ISBN 3791371924, March 2014
- Yves Klein – Into the Blue (Can You Tell It's Art?), Hatje Cantz Verlag Berlin, ISBN 978-3-7757-1486-0, published in September 2004

=== Exhibition catalogues ===
- Nina Hollein. Homecoming. Edited by Alfred Weidinger, Manfred Mandl, Maria Venzl and Genoveva Rückert. OÖ Landes-Kultur GmbH, Linz, 2024. ISBN 978-3-85474-411-5.
- Inspiration Comes From Everyday Life. With Elfie Semotan. The Green Box. ISBN 978-3-96216-025-8.

== Exhibitions ==
- "Palindrome" – Kunstverein Familie Montez (Frankfurt): in collaboration with Hollein's brother Philipp Schweiger, July to August 2021
- „Homecomming“, Schlossmuseum Linz, Mai - October 2024
- "Inspiration comes from Everyday Life" - in collaboration with Elfie Semotan in the Austrian Cultural Forum New York, Mai - September 2024
- Body Spinners, Galerie Eva Presenhuber, Vienna (11 November – 4 December 2026).

== Personal life ==
Hollein is married to curator and museum director Max Hollein. They have three children and currently live in New York City.
