= Max Hollein =

Austrian art historian and business manager

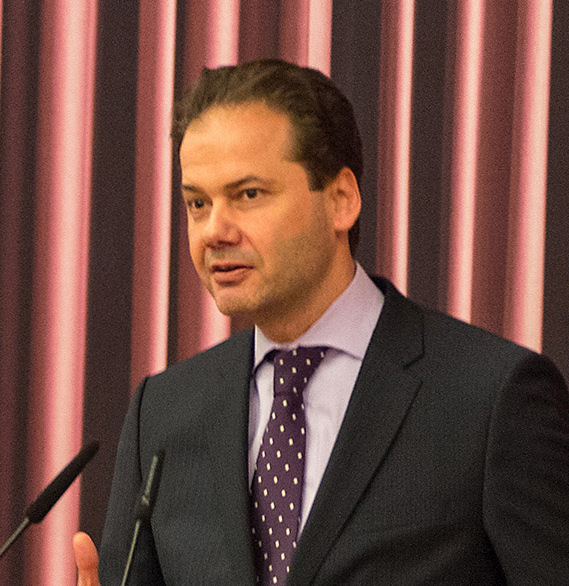
- Hollein at the opening of the Monet exhibition in the Städel Museum in 2015

Director and CEO of the Metropolitan Museum of Art
- Incumbent
- Assumed office July 2023

Director of the Metropolitan Museum of Art
- Incumbent
- Assumed office 2018
- Preceded by: Thomas P. Campbell

Director and CEO of the Fine Arts Museums of San Francisco
- In office 2016–2018

Director and CEO of Städel Museum, Liebieghaus, Schirn Kunsthalle
- In office 2006–2016

Director of Schirn Kunsthalle Frankfurt
- In office 2001–2006

Personal details
- Born: 7 July 1969 (age 57) Vienna, Austria
- Parent: Hans Hollein (father)
- Relatives: Lilli Hollein (sister)
- Education: University of Vienna; Vienna University of Economics

Max Hollein (born 7 July 1969) is an Austrian art historian and the CEO and Director of the Metropolitan Museum of Art in New York City. He was Director and CEO of the Fine Arts Museums of San Francisco from July 2016, until April 2018, when the Metropolitan Museum of Art announced that Hollein would become its 10th director.

Hollein oversaw both the de Young and the Legion of Honor museums, which together are the seventh most-visited art institutions in the United States, with 1.4 million visitors in 2016. Hollein joined the Fine Arts Museums in July 2016 from his position as the director of Schirn Kunsthalle Frankfurt, Städel Museum and the Liebieghaus Skulpturensammlung.

== Life ==
Hollein was born in Vienna in 1969 to architect Hans Hollein and Helene Hollein. He studied art history at the University of Vienna and business administration at the Vienna University of Economics. During this period, he also free-lanced for the business section of the national daily newspaper "Der Standard". In 1995, following the successful completion of his studies with two master's degrees, one in art history and the other in business administration, he moved to New York City to take on the position of project director of exhibitions at the Solomon R. Guggenheim Museum in New York.

From 1996 until the end of 2000, he worked closely with Guggenheim director Thomas Krens, initially as "Executive Assistant to the Director" and, from 1998 onward, as "Chief of Staff and Manager of European Relations" responsible for key projects such as the establishment of the exhibition halls "Deutsche Guggenheim Berlin" and "Guggenheim Las Vegas". He was also involved in fundraising, travelling exhibitions, the inauguration activities at Guggenheim Bilbao as well as liaising with European cultural institutions, collectors, media, curators and sponsors.

== Career ==
=== Schirn Kunsthalle ===
From 2001 to 2016, Hollein was the director of the Schirn Kunsthalle Frankfurt. He repositioned the Schirn Kunsthalle Frankfurt nationally as well as internationally through a highly popular yet challenging exhibition programme from classical to contemporary art mounting up to ten major shows per year. The depth, quality and quantity of the programme has been accompanied by a significant increase in corporate funding. Among the highlights of the programme have been exhibitions such as "Shopping: A Century of Art and Consumer Culture", "Henri Matisse: Drawing with Scissors", "Yves Klein", "The Naked Truth: Klimt, Egon Schiele, Kokoschka and Other Scandals", "Women Impressionists" and "Edvard Munch. The Modern Eye". With projects such as "Playing the City 3" or "Street Art Brazil", he expanded his programming into urban spaces of Frankfurt. At the Schirn, his frequent collaborator was noted art historian Olivier Berggruen. In 2007 Hollein advocated against the demolition of the Schirn Rotunda and instead initiated a commission series with contemporary artists like Barbara Kruger, Ayse Erkmen, Rosa Barba or Heather Phillipson to create site specific works at the rotunda. Its online and digital outreach has been significantly advanced and the Schirn publishes its own wide-reaching online magazine "Schirn Mag" since 2011. 2014, Hollein opened the Minishirn – a creative space for children. By 2019, the Schirn had attracted more than 8.8 million visitors to over 240 exhibitions. For many years now, the Schirn has been the most popular art institution in the Rhine-Main region. In 2012 the Schirn had its best-attended year so far with a total of 479,121 visitors.

=== Städel Museum ===
In addition to his directorship at the Schirn, Hollein became the Director and CEO of the Städel Museum in 2006. At the Städel Museum, Hollein introduced a wide spectrum of new exhibition formats. Hollein realised major exhibitions on the Old Masters, including "Cranach the Elder", "The Master of Flémalle and Rogier van der Weyden", and "From Titian to Tiepolo", "Botticelli", and "Albrecht Dürer" and "Maniera", as well as significant retrospectives on modern masters such as Ernst Ludwig Kirchner and Max Beckmann. Under Hollein, special emphasis was also given to the development of the collection: between 2006 and 2012 more than 1,500 works were added to the collection, including previously underrepresented media such as photographs, and works by female artists. He expanded the Städel its holdings of contemporary art and started organizing exhibitions on contemporary artists such as Piero Manzoni and, John Baldessari, or and "Georg Baselitz: The Heroes". Among the most significant projects worthy of mention in this context was the major expansion of the Städel Museum completed in 2012 which doubled the institution's gallery space and created a new wing for the presentation of art since 1945. Both the architecture as well as the significant collection development were hailed by the public and the media. More than 50 percent of the 52 million euro construction costs were raised through private sources in an unprecedented fundraising campaign. The Städel was honoured as "Museum of the Year 2012" by the German art critics association AICA in 2012. In the same year, the museum recorded its highest ever attendance numbers, with 447,395 visitors. To mark the 200th anniversary of the Städel in 2015, Hollein significantly expanded the museum's reach with the launch of new digital education formats, such as Art History Online and Café Deutschland

=== Liebieghaus Skulpturensammlung ===
Under Hollein's directorship, from 2006 to 2016, the Liebieghaus Skulpturensammlung underwent the greatest reorganisation of its infrastructure since 1990. The Art of Ancient Egypt and Antiquities, Middle Ages, Renaissance, Baroque to Neoclassicism as well as the "studioli" on the top floor of the museum villa were newly installed under his tenure and reopened in 2008 with an entirely new color and lighting concept. Funding for this major renovation came to a large extent from private and corporate sources. Exhibitions such as "Sahure – Death and Life of a Great Pharaoh", "Gods in Color ", "Franz Xaver Messerschmidt" were received with unprecedented attention. "Gods in Color" underlines the museum's leading role in polychromy research and became a traveling exhibition with more than 20 venues, including the Ny Ny Carlsberg Glyptotek Copenhagen, Vatican Museums Rome, Archeological Museum Istanbul, Getty Villa Los Angeles, or Palacio de las Bellas Artes Mexico. Of note was also the exhibition "Jeff Koons: The Sculptor", as part of the two-part survey together with the Schirn Kunsthalle. In the presentation at the Liebieghaus, both world-renowned and new sculptural works by Koons entered into a dialogue with the historic building and its collection spanning 5,000 years of sculpture.

In 2012 the Liebieghaus had 153,737 visitors, making it the best attended year in the history of the institution.

=== Fine Arts Museums of San Francisco ===
Hollein assumed the role of Director and CEO of the Fine Arts Museums of San Francisco on 1 June 2016. In this capacity, he managed an operating budget of $60 million and over 500 employees.

During his time in office, Hollein instituted a major restructuring of the museum organization and added the institution's first contemporary curator; Claudia Schmuckli. He also successfully launched a contemporary art initiative, bringing the work of living artists into dialogue with the buildings and collections of the de Young Museum and Legion of Honor, with exhibitions by Urs Fischer, Sarah Lucas and Sarah Lucas and Julian Schnabel at the Legion of Honor and Carsten Nicolai and Leonardo Drew at the de Young museum. In January 2017, the institution announced a significant new addition to its collection of American art through the acquisition of 62 works by 22 contemporary African American artists, including Thornton Dial's Blood And Meat: Survival For the World (1992) and Lost Cows (2000–1), Joe Light's Dawn (1988), Jessie T. Pettway's Bars and String-Pierced Columns (1950's), Lonnie Holley's Him and Her Hold the Root (1994) and Joe Minter's Camel at the Watering Hole (1995)), celebrated in the exhibition "Revelations: Art from the African American South". Hollein opened several critically acclaimed exhibitions, including The Brothers Le Nain: Painters of Seventeenth Century France, Frank Stella: A Retrospective, Danny Lyon: Message to the Future, Monet: The Earl Years and Stuart Davis: In Full Swing. Ed Ruscha and the Great American West, Cult of the Machine, and The Summer of Love Experience: Art, Fashion, and Rock & Roll which drew almost 270,000 visitors and 400.000 online visits from around the world, making the exhibition the highest attendance in recent years.Hollein expanded the de Young furthermore on the encyclopedic focus of its program, with exhibitions such as Teotihuacan: City of Water, City of Fire, The Maori Portraits: Gottfried Lindauer's New Zealand, and Contemporary Muslim Fashions. This exhibition was especially praised for the curatorial consultation with and engagement of Muslim representatives from throughout the Bay Area.

Hollein also expanded the institution's educational outreach, including digital interactive tools to prepare for exhibitions, and the construction of the DeYoungster's Studio – a learning space that fosters children's curiosity and understanding of art.

=== Metropolitan Museum of Art ===
In April 2018, the Metropolitan Museum of Art announced that Hollein will become its 10th director. He succeeded in a selection process whose finalists included Adam D. Weinberg, Julián Zugazagoitia, Emilie Gordenker, Timothy Rub, and Taco Dibbits. His appointment was supported by many in the art world; and criticized in three newspapers, The Guardian, The New York Times and The Observer for being the 10th white man appointed to the position at the Met, suggesting the institution's lack of diversity. Hollein shared his vision for the present and future role of encyclopedic museums, and outlined that he aims for The Met's galleries and programming to present a range of perspectives on history and examine the intersection of cultures, rather than offer a singular, linear narrative. Showcasing The Met's scholarly depth and breadth, exhibitions that have been opened since 2018 span across all 17 curatorial departments at The Met, and include exhibitions such as "Alice Neel: People Come First ", "The Medici. Portraits and Politics, 1512–1570", "Camp: Notes on Fashion", "Crossroads", "Jacob Lawrence: The American Struggle", "The Last Knight: The Art, Armor, and Ambition of Maximilian I", "Making The Met, 1870–2020", "Gerhard Richter: Painting After All", "Sahel: Art and Empires on the Shores of the Sahara", "The Tale of Genji: A Japanese Classic Illuminated, "Surrealism Beyond Borders", "Inspiring Walt Disney: The Animation of French Decorative Arts", and "Charles Ray: Figure Ground".

Hollein has also engaged in broader cultural debates as The Met's Director, including penning an essay about the Museum's leadership responsibilities in upholding the policies and practices for the acquisition of art and archaeological materials, and protecting cultural heritage around the globe. In 2020, Daniel H. Weiss and Max Hollein publicly announced The Met's commitments to Anti-Racism, Diversity, and the wellbeing of their communities. This plan includes the assessment of the Museum's history, the diversification of its collection and program, and the hiring and training of staff. One of the recent curatorial hires includes The Met's first full-time person of Indigenous descent hired for a curatorial position, Patricia Marroquin Norby.

Early in his tenure, Hollein said he would focus on further injecting modern and contemporary art into The Met's main Fifth Avenue building. He announced a comprehensive new program to that effect. The new annual façade commission was inaugurated in 2019 with Wangechi Mutu. For the inaugural Great Hall commission in 2019, The Met invited the Cree artist Kent Monkman, to create contemporary history paintings that serve as commentary on the Indigenous experience and colonialism, and consider The Met's collection with a critical eye. Hollein also added its first-ever contemporary Period Room to its existing system of 29 period rooms, its so-called Afrofuturist Period Room titled "Before Yesterday We Could Fly", and among others, curated by Hannah Beachler and Michelle Commander. Hollein built on The Met's digital platforms to scale its educational initiatives and disseminate content.

During its COVID-19-related closure, the MET celebrated its 150th birthday. Despite difficult times and a forced lack of visitors, Hollein helped the museum achieve economic stability. The museum pivoted quickly to virtual programs and to highlight its digital offerings, which have seen a significant expansion since. By 2021, The Met saw over 30 million visitors annually to their website. Hollein also took a stand on social controversies on several occasions and acknowledged the fundamental right of artists to protest against the controversial Sackler funding.

In lectures Hollein shares that The Met will invest in the next ten years to update the gallery system, with a special emphasis on refreshing and recontextualizing its narratives. Projects include $70 million renovation of its Michael C. Rockefeller Wing, that is home to the galleries for the arts of Africa, Oceania, and the Americas, Ancient Near Eastern and Cypriot Art, European Paintings, as well as the reenvisioning of the progress on previously announced plans to remodel its Modern Wing.

In July 2019, the museum reported that it had over 7 million visitors for a third year in a row.

In 2019, Hollein was a member of the jury that selected Doris Salcedo for the Nomura Art Award and to receive $1 million.

Since July 2023 Hollein adds to his function as director the CEO title. The move marks a return to the Met’s old leadership structure, wherein the director of the institution is responsible for both the programmatic direction of the museum as well as its day-to-day operations.

== Other activities ==
=== Curator ===
- Venice Architecture Biennale 2000, US pavilion
- Venice Art Biennale 2005, Austrian pavilion
- Art in the Lufthansa Innovation Center
- Salzburg Avantgarde-Festival "kontra.com" on the occasion of the Mozart Year 2006

=== Corporate boards ===
- Deutsche Bank, Member of the Advisory Board (2006–2012)

=== Non-profit organizations ===
- State Hermitage Museum in Saint Petersburg, Member of the International Advisory Board (until 2022)
- Hall Art Foundation, Member of the Advisory Board
- İstanbul Modern, Member of the Advisory Board
- Museum Berggruen, Member of the International Council
- Nomura Art Award, Member of the Jury
- University of Applied Arts Vienna, Member of the International Advisory Board
- University of Art and Design Offenbach am Main, Member of the Advisory Board
- Arts Sponsorship Award of the Association of Arts and Culture of the German Economy, Member of the Jury

== Personal life ==
Hollein is married to fashion designer Nina Hollein; they have three children.

== Awards ==
- 2009 – Chevalier dans l`Ordre des Arts et des Lettres by the French Minister of Culture
- 2010 – Austrian Cross of Honour for Science and Art
- 2015 – Binding-Kulturpreis
- 2016 – Goethe-Plakette des Landes Hessen
- 2019 – Goethe Plaque of the City of Frankfurt
- 2020 – WU Manager of the Year
- 2022 – Hommage, Konrad Adenauer Foundation

== Selected publications ==
- Schnabel, Julian; Sofía, Museo Nacional Centro de Arte Reina (2004). Julian Schnabel (in German). Hatje Cantz Verlag. ISBN 978-3-7757-1386-3.
- Berggruen, Olivier; Hollein, Max (25 April 2006). Henri Matisse: Drawing with Scissors. National Geographic Books. ISBN 978-3-7913-3473-8.
- Berggruen, Olivier; Hollein, Max (2006). Picasso und das Theater. ISBN 978-3-7757-1872-1.
- Odilon Redon, As in a Dream. 2007. ISBN 978-3-7757-1894-3.
- Julian Schnabel: Symbols of Actual Life, release date 12 February 2019, by Max Hollein. Prestel, 2019.
