= Oud Holland =

- Discipline: Art history
- Language: English
- Edited by: Elmer Kolfin

Publication details
- History: 1883–present
- Publisher: Brill Publishers/Netherlands Institute for Art History (Netherlands)
- Frequency: Quarterly

Standard abbreviations
- ISO 4: Oud Holl.

Indexing
- ISSN: 0030-672X (print); 1875-0176 (web)

Links
- Journal homepage

Oud Holland – Journal for Art of the Low Countries is a quarterly peer-reviewed academic journal covering art from the (Northern) Netherlands and Southern Netherlands (Belgium) from c. 1400–1920. The journal describes itself as the oldest surviving art-historical periodical in the world. It was founded by Adriaan de Vries and Nicolaas de Roever in 1883 and has appeared almost without interruption since. It has been supported by the RKD – Netherlands Institute for Art History since 1972, and has been published by Brill Publishers in cooperation with the RKD since 2008. The editorial board consists of Elmer Kolfin (editor-in-chief), Menno Jonker (managing editor), John Bezold (online review editor), Jan Dirk Baetens, Yvonne Bleyerveld, Edwin Buijsen, Nils Büttner, Volker Manuth, Tine Luk Meganck, Ingrid Vermeulen. Articles are published in English and occasionally in Dutch.

== Abstracting and indexing ==
The journal is abstracted and indexed in:

- Art Abstracts
- Art Index
- Arts & Humanities Citation Index
- Avery Index to Architectural Periodicals
- Bibliography of the History of Art
- Current Contents/Arts & Humanities
- Répertoire International de Littérature Musicale
- Russian Academy of Sciences Bibliographies
- Scopus
