= Fondation Custodia =

French art museum in Paris

The Fondation Custodia
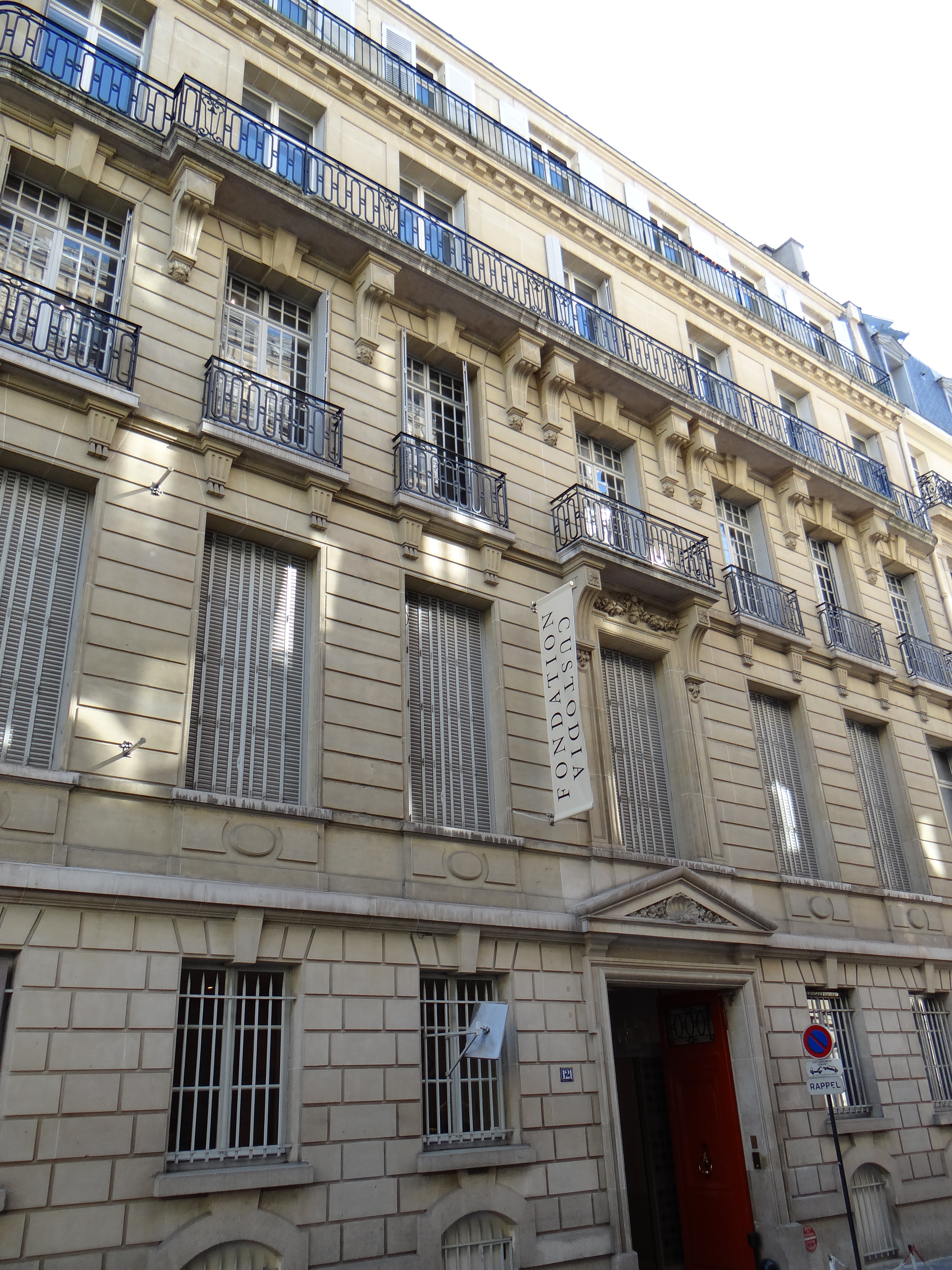
- Fondation Custodia - 121 rue de Lille
- Established: 1947; 79 years ago
- Coordinates: 48°51′41″N 2°19′11″E
- Type: Art museum
- Collections: 7,000 Old Master drawings, 15,000 prints, and 450 paintings.
- Founder: Frits Lugt
- Director: Stijn Alsteens
- Website: fondationcustodia.fr

The Fondation Custodia is an art collection in the 7th arrondissement of Paris, focusing on European Old Master works, including works by Dutch, Flemish, Italian and French artists. It was founded in 1947 by the collector and art historian Frits Lugt and his wife Jacoba Lugt-Klever to house their collection of drawings, prints and paintings. Located at 121 rue de Lille, it occupies the Hôtel Turgot, an 18th-century mansion.

== History ==
Frits Lugt, born in Amsterdam in 1884 and died in Paris in 1970, was a famous Dutch art historian. He catalogued the collections of Dutch drawings in Parisian public institutions (Musée du Louvre, Bibliothèque nationale de France and Ecole nationale des beaux-arts). He is most famous for his survey of collector’s marks on drawings and prints, which is still a reference work for specialists today and continues to be enriched in the form of a growing online database.

Throughout his life, Frits Lugt was a keen art lover and collector. He built up a unique collection of drawings, prints, old books, paintings, artists' letters and Indian miniatures. Inspired by the example of the private American foundations he had visited while living in the United States during the Second World War, he decided in 1947 to create the Fondation Custodia (whose name means "safekeeping" in Latin) and to transfer his collection and his assets there. The foundation was set up in the Hôtel Turgot in Paris, and in 1957 Frits Lugt also created the Institut néerlandais, housed in the neighbouring Hôtel Lévis-Mirepoix. This Dutch cultural centre was founded in collaboration with the Dutch government. In 2013, the latter withdrew its subsidy and the Institut néerlandais closed its doors for good.

The Fondation Custodia continues to acquire works to enrich the Lugt Collection and regularly organises exhibitions and guided tours of the Hôtel Turgot. It also lends works to exhibitions in France and abroad and is open to specialists and art lovers by appointment. It has a library whose collection, specialised in the field of Western fine arts from 1450 to 1900, is particularly extensive for graphic arts and exhaustive for the art of the Northern Schools of the Golden Age.

== Collection ==
The collection, continually added to that formed by Lugt, includes works by Dutch, Flemish, Italian, French, Danish, British, German artists, and features over 7,000 Old Master drawings, 15,000 prints, and 450 paintings.

The drawings date from the 15th to the mid-19th century and mainly concern the Dutch and Flemish schools of the 17th century (Rembrandt, Samuel van Hoogstraten, Lambert Doomer, Ferdinand Bol), but there are also works from France (Claude Lorrain, Antoine Watteau, François Boucher), Italy (Domenico Beccafumi, Sebastiano Ricci, Tiepolo, Germany, Denmark and England. The prints are also dominated by Dutch and Flemish masters of the 16th and 17th centuries. Particularly noteworthy are prints of almost all of Rembrandt's etchings, rare engravings by Lucas van Leyden, portraits of artists, Italian, German and Dutch woodcuts, and high-quality French portrait etchings.

The foundation also holds a collection of some 450 paintings. The first part consists of works by Dutch and Flemish painters of the sixteenth and seventeenth centuries. All genres are represented, from portraits to still life, genre scenes and landscapes.

Among the paintings are church interiors by Pieter Saenredam and Emanuel de Witte, genre scenes by Jan Brueghel the Elder, Joos van Craesbeeck, Willem Kalf, Jan Steen and Esaias Boursse, scenes from sacred history by Herri met de Bles, Gillis Mostaert, Joachim Beuckelaer, Pieter Lastman, Thomas de Keyser and David Teniers the Younger, and still lifes by Jan Davidsz. de Heem, Jacob van Es, Ambrosius Bosschaert the Younger, Willem Kalf and Jan van Kessel, seascapes by Ludolf Backhuysen, Dutch landscapes by Hendrick Avercamp, Esaias Van de Velde the Elder, Jan van de Velde the Younger, Jacob van Ruisdael, Jan Lievens, Aert van der Neer, Jan van Goyen, Paulus Potter, Jan Both, Aelbert Cuyp and Gerrit Berckheyde, Italian landscapes by Cornelis van Poelenburgh, Nicolaes Berchem, Karel Dujardin, portraits by Jan Antonisz van Ravesteyn, Jan de Bray, Caspar Netscher, David Teniers the Younger and Nicolaes Maes. Other schools and painters from later centuries are represented by works from Sofonisba Anguissola, Paolo Porpora, Jacques Linard, Nicolas de Largillière and Francesco Guardi.

The second part, of almost 300 paintings, is devoted to 19th century European painting. These are mainly oil sketches, landscapes executed in the open air.

The collection of artists' letters, developed especially after Frits Lugt, is one of the most important in the world with more than 40,000 items dating from the Renaissance to the present day. It also includes correspondence from collectors and art connoisseurs. Letters from French artists of the 17th and 19th centuries predominate. Among the famous artists, the foundation holds letters from Michelangelo, Albrecht Dürer, Rembrandt, Jean-Georges Wille, Paul Gauguin, Henri Matisse and Dimitri Bouchène.

Finally, the Fondation Custodia has smaller collections of Indian miniatures, miniature portraits, old books (particularly 17th century Dutch), original frames (1,000 pieces), Chinese porcelain and a few antique objects of Greek, Roman and Egyptian origin.
