= CODART =

Scholarly organization

- CODART – International Council for Curators of Dutch and Flemish Art
- Abbreviation: CODART
- Formation: 1998
- Type: Professional network
- Headquarters: The Hague, Netherlands
- Region served: International
- Official language: English
- Website: https://www.codart.nl/

CODART (International Council for Curators of Dutch and Flemish Art) is an international network of museum curators devoted to the study and display of Dutch art and Flemish art worldwide.

Founded in 1998 by the art historian Gary Schwartz, and based in The Hague, the organization promotes professional exchange, research collaboration, and the international visibility of art from the Low Countries.

CODART organizes an annual international congress, bringing together curators responsible for Dutch and Flemish art museum art collections. The organization also maintains an online platform featuring exhibition announcements, publications, job postings, and professional resources related to Netherlandish art history. It regularly contributes programming to TEFAF.

It works in cooperation with museums, research institutes (such as the Netherlands Institute for Art History (RKD)), and cultural organizations to support scholarship and collection-based research in the field, and has played a role in facilitating international collaboration among curators and institutions holding significant collections of seventeenth-century Dutch and Flemish paintings.

== Activities ==
CODART's activities include:

- Organizing annual congresses hosted by partner museums
- Supporting curatorial research and professional exchange
- Publishing news and scholarly resources through its website
- Maintaining a global network of curators specializing in art of the Low Countries

== See also ==
- Historians of Netherlandish Art
