= Frits Lugt =

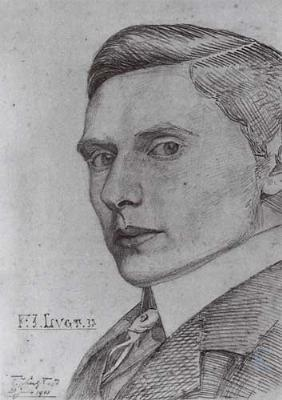
- Self-portrait
- Born: Frits Lugt; 4 May 1884; Amsterdam
- Died: 15 July 1970 (aged 86); Paris
- Known for: Drawing, Engraving, Art History
- Movement: Baroque

Frederik Johannes "Frits" Lugt (Amsterdam 4 May 1884 – 15 July 1970 Paris), was a self-taught collector and connoisseur of Dutch drawings and prints and a selfless and tireless compiler of essential reference tools documenting Northern European prints and drawings, collectors' stamps and sale catalogues. An authority on Rembrandt's drawings, he collected all of the known etchings made by Rembrandt during his career.

== Biography ==
Lugt was a precocious connoisseur who made a catalog of his own Museum Lugtius at age eight. Encouraged by his father, he became an art expert at a young age and cut short his formal education in 1901 to become an employee at the auction house of Frederik Muller in Amsterdam. Lugt's marriage in 1910 to Jacoba Klever (1888–1969), a woman of independent means, meant that he could pursue his interests without financial concerns. By 1911 he had become a partner of the firm, a position he held until 1915. One of his tasks at the auction house was the compilation of auctioneers' sale catalogues. Though art history as an academic field did not exist, he made a difficult choice to focus on this, and gave up his budding art career. He began to collect art with his wife, travelling throughout Europe for this and focussing on masters of the Dutch Golden Age. Upon the death of his father-in-law in 1931, his wife inherited a sizeable fortune, which enabled the couple to expand their collecting interests.

== Research ==
His ongoing interest resulted in the four volumes of his famous Répertoire des catalogues de ventes publiques intéressant l'art ou la curiosité ("Repertory of catalogues of public sale concerned with art or objets d'art") published in 1938, 1953, 1964, and (posthumously) 1987, which gives essential details of sales catalogues published during the years 1600–1925, concerning art works held in public collections in Europe and North America. The "Lugt number" of a sale catalogue is a familiar reference. While he was still occupied with this project, he donated his huge collection of sale catalogues and other documentary materials to the Netherlands Institute for Art History (RKD) at The Hague along with his personal library, in the nature of a "permanent loan."

== Collectors' marks ==
In 1921, he completed his first work essential to art historians, Les marques de collections de dessins et d’estampes, the definitive repertory identifying the collector's marks and stamps on drawings and prints, with a short descriptive biography of each owner and a description of the particular collection; the work is the essential reference for establishing the provenance of Old Master drawings and prints. In 1956 this first volume on collectors' marks was followed by a Supplément.

== Inventory catalogs for Paris collections ==
In 1922 he was commissioned to compile the inventory catalogue of Dutch and Flemish drawings in the Musée du Louvre. The first volume appeared in 1927, the series eventually comprising nine volumes cataloguing drawings of the Northern schools not only from the Louvre's collection but also in other collections in Paris, including the Petit Palais (the collection of Eugène Dutuit), the Bibliothèque Nationale, and the École des Beaux-Arts. In 1932 he moved his family and growing art collection to the Lange Vijverberg in The Hague, in the house that now houses the Museum Bredius. This building was only a few hundred yards from the young Netherlands Institute for Art History, and across the Hofvijver from the Mauritshuis.

== Oberlin College ==
When war threatened the Netherlands, the Lugts together sent the top pieces of their impressive collection of drawings, prints, books, and paintings in six packages to Switzerland. During the Second World War, the couple fled to the United States, where Wolfgang Stechow secured a temporary position for him lecturing at Oberlin College, Ohio. While in America Lugt was impressed by the number of public institutions founded by private bequests. After the war they returned to their home in The Hague by boat, accompanied by fifty chests of books, catalogs, journals, and reproductions, most of which he gave to the RKD. Together the husband and wife team proceeded to recover the parts of their collection that they had not previously sent to Switzerland and that had been seized by the German occupying forces.

== Fondation Custodia ==
In the style of self-taught American philanthropists such as Andrew Carnegie, Lugt, whose devout Mennonite faith led him to consider their art collection part of God's gift, sought a cultural center which would make their collection accessible to the public: the result was the Fondation Custodia (1947), which continues to conserve the Lugt art collection, housed in the eighteenth-century Hôtel Turgot, Rue de Lille, Paris. The next thing Lugt did was to arrange accommodation for a center devoted to scholarship and the arts in the Netherlands. After attempts to found this in their home on the Lange Vijverberg in The Hague, this became the Institut Néerlandais in Paris (1957).

== Legacy ==
Frits Lugt survived his wife by less than a year. In his sale catalog for the illustrious 18th-century art collector Pierre-Jean Mariette, he signed it as 'your very humble and very dutiful great-great-grandson'. He certainly managed to collect more art than Mariette. At the time he died, the Lugt collection consisted of about six thousand drawings, thirty thousand prints, and two hundred paintings. His research is preserved in the databases of the RKD, while much of his art is still preserved in Paris.
