= Henry Clay Frick House =

Museum building in Manhattan, New York

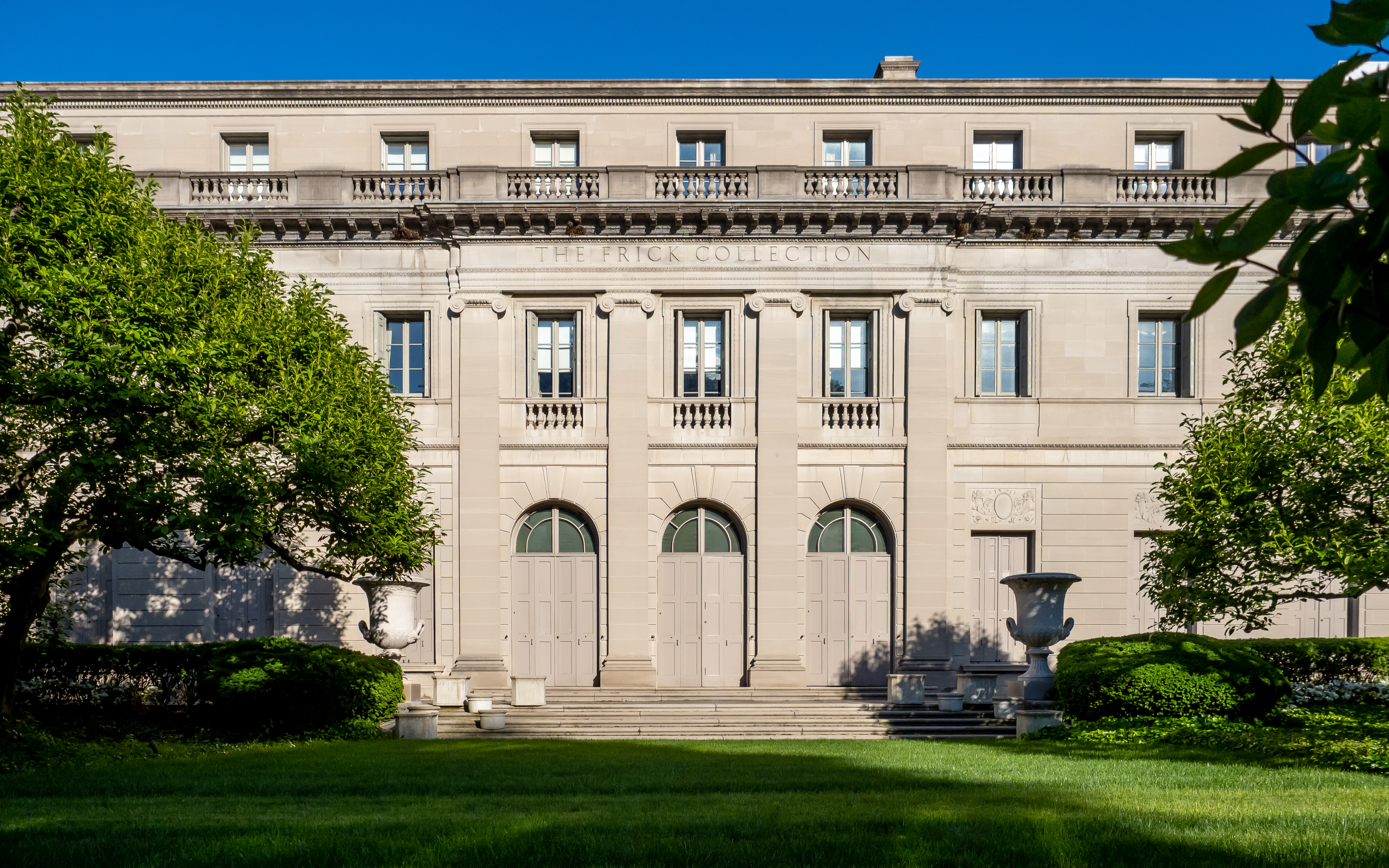
- The main facade on Fifth Avenue
- Alternative names: Frick House, Frick Collection

General information
- Type: Mansion
- Architectural style: Beaux-Arts
- Location: 1 East 70th Street, Manhattan, New York, United States
- Coordinates: 40°46′17″N 73°58′02″W
- Current tenants: Frick Collection
- Construction started: 1912
- Completed: 1914

Technical details
- Floor count: 3

Design and construction
- Architect: Thomas Hastings
- Henry Clay Frick House
- U.S. National Register of Historic Places
- U.S. National Historic Landmark
- U.S. Historic district – Contributing property
- New York State Register of Historic Places
- New York City Landmark
- Location within New York City Location within New York Location within the United States
- Coordinates: 40.7713°N 73.9673°W
- Area: 1.26 acres (0.51 ha)
- Part of: Upper East Side Historic District (ID84002803)
- NRHP reference No.: 08001091
- NYSRHP No.: 06101.000813
- NYCL No.: 0667

Significant dates
- Added to NRHP: October 6, 2008
- Designated NHL: October 6, 2008
- Designated CP: September 7, 1984
- Designated NYCL: March 20, 1973

The Henry Clay Frick House (also known as the Frick Collection building or 1 East 70th Street) is a mansion and museum building on Fifth Avenue, between 70th and 71st streets, on the Upper East Side of Manhattan in New York City, United States. Designed by Thomas Hastings as the residence of the industrialist Henry Clay Frick, the house contains the Frick Collection museum and the Frick Art Reference Library. The house and library building are designated as a New York City landmark and National Historic Landmark.

The house has three stories and is separated from Fifth Avenue by an elevated garden. It has three wings to the north, center, and south, arranged in an L shape. The limestone facade contains several carved pediments and tympana. Most of the house remained essentially unchanged from the time of its construction until 1931. The first floor contained the family's communal rooms; the second floor contained their bedrooms and private rooms; and the third floor contained the servants' quarters. There was also a basement with service areas. The first and second-floor rooms have been adapted into museum spaces over the years.

Frick bought the site of the Lenox Library in 1906 and 1907 but could not redevelop it for several years. Initially, Frick sought designs from Daniel Burnham, but ultimately he commissioned Hastings, who designed a three-story mansion in the Beaux-Arts style. Construction took place between 1912 and 1914. Frick lived in the building only until his death in 1919, but his wife Adelaide and daughter Helen continued to live there until Adelaide died in 1931. Following a renovation, and in accordance with Frick's will, the house opened to the public as the Frick Collection in 1935. The building was enlarged slightly in 1977 and 2011, which has altered the original appearance of the house. From 2020 to 2025, the house was closed for an extensive renovation that expanded the museum. Over the years, the mansion has received generally positive architectural commentary.

== Site ==
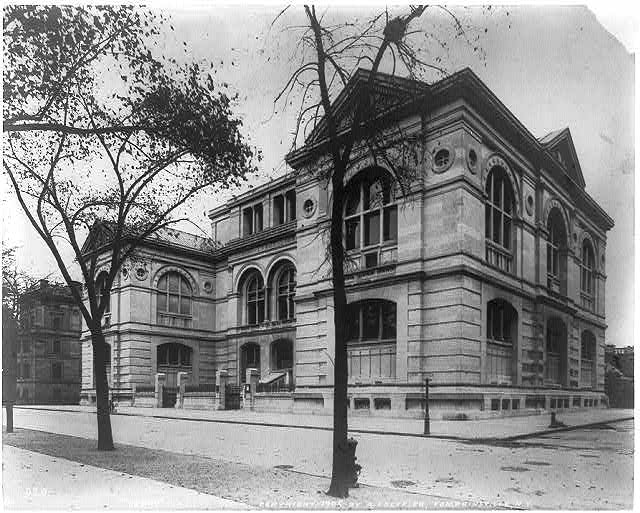
The plot was originally the location of the Lenox Library from 1877 to 1912.

The Henry Clay Frick House is at 1 East 70th Street in the Lenox Hill section of the Upper East Side of Manhattan in New York City. It is bounded by Fifth Avenue and Central Park to the west, 70th Street to the south, and 71st Street to the north. The rectangular land lot occupies about half of its city block and covers 45,175 square feet (4,197 m^{2}), with a frontage of around 200 feet (61 m) on Fifth Avenue and 275 feet (84 m) on the side streets. The mansion originally occupied a smaller, 200-by-175-foot (61 by 53 m) site, which covered about a third of the block. The rest of the city block is composed of townhouses, including 11, 15, 17, 19, and 21 East 70th Street to the east. 880 Fifth Avenue is on the block to the south, while the Gertrude Rhinelander Waldo House is one block to the northwest. The mansion is part of Fifth Avenue's Museum Mile and houses the Frick Collection, the southernmost museum on that strip.

The site had been part of the Lenox family's farm until the late 19th century. The site of the Frick House then became the Lenox Library, designed in a neo-Grec style by Richard Morris Hunt. The library had contained paintings and books owned by the philanthropist James Lenox. Frick's house occupies a 200-by-175-foot (61 by 53 m) site that includes both the library and an adjacent strip. The eastern half of the block was sold to other developers, who had erected residences there by 1910. The entire block was restricted to residential use until 1929, although the Frick House was excluded from this restriction in 1926. After the mansion became a museum, its site was expanded to include the land occupied by the Widener House at 5 East 70th Street (built in 1909 by Warren and Wetmore); 7 East 70th Street (built in 1911 by C. P. H. Gilbert); and a third house at 9 East 70th Street (built in 1915).

When Frick built the house in the early 1910s, he planted 13 chestnut trees on the sidewalk of Fifth Avenue between 70th and 71st streets, each of which were at least 30 years old. To accommodate the trees, he excavated the sidewalk to a depth of 6 feet (1.8 m), then obtained soil from Long Island, in which the trees were planted. The trees were planted on the property for only a year and a half before all dying, because the soil was contaminated with poisonous illuminating gas. Afterward, they were replaced with sycamores. A single poplar tree, which had existed on the block before even the Lenox Library was built, remained on Frick's estate until 1918.

=== Gardens ===
Most of the house, except for the gallery wing at the north end, is recessed 75 feet (23 m) behind a garden on Fifth Avenue. This contrasted with similarly large mansions built in Manhattan during the early 20th century, which were generally built as close as possible to the boundaries of their lots, and was unique for a mansion on Fifth Avenue. Original plans called for a sunken garden facing Fifth Avenue, flanked by the house on two sides, with a pool in the center. The William H. Jackson Company designed a wrought iron fence around the Fifth Avenue garden, while John Williams Inc. designed entrance gates in the same style. When the house was completed, there was a stone wall with a balustrade along Fifth Avenue, and the garden itself had evergreen trees. A pebbled path ran through the garden. A small formal garden sat at the south end of the Fifth Avenue garden, at the same level as the house's first floor. Three magnolia trees were planted during a 1939 renovation; by the late 20th century, the Fifth Avenue garden was cited as containing roses, violets, lantana, blue Egyptian lily, and white petunias. The garden was rarely open to the public until the late 2000s.

There is another garden on 70th Street, which was completed when the Frick Collection renovated the house in 1977. The garden, the only one designed by Russell Page in New York City, spans about 60 by 80 feet (18 by 24 m). A temporary garden had been proposed on that site in 1973 in advance of the development of a six-story annex, but the garden became permanent after the annex was canceled. Although there are gravel paths, the garden was intended to be viewed rather than strolled through. The garden contains plantings such as boxwood, water lilies, quince, wisteria, and pear trees, as well as a central pool. The pool and trees were arranged to make the garden look larger than it actually was. There is an iron fence on the south edge of the garden, as well as a one-story parapet wall on the north and west edges. The eastern wall has three nautically themed lunettes, which face three large windows on the eastern wall of the house's annex.

There was also originally a private courtyard at the rear or east side of the building, accessed from the living room. The rear court had a 60-by-15-foot (18.3 by 4.6 m) pool with a central fountain. (Note: The New York Times described the pool as having been planned for the Fifth Avenue garden.) The rear court was demolished when the current garden court was built in the 1930s.

== Architecture ==
Thomas Hastings of the architectural partnership of Carrère and Hastings designed the mansion for the family of industrialist Henry Clay Frick in the Beaux-Arts or Italian Renaissance Revival style. Following multiple expansions over the years, the present structure is about double the size of the original mansion. John Russell Pope designed the entrance on 70th Street and the Frick Art Reference Library, completed in 1935. A one-story annex on 70th Street, finished in 1977, was designed by Harry van Dyke, G. Frederick Poehler, and John Barrington Bayley. Another expansion in the 2020s was designed by Annabelle Selldorf.

Indiana limestone was used for the exterior and parts of the interior of the mansion. Frick hired limestone contractor William Bradley & Son, steel contractor Post & McCord, and masonry contractor Cauldwell-Wingate Company to build the house. The Piccirilli Brothers designed several pediments for the facade (which were contracted out to other sculptors), while Samuel Yellin and John Williams were responsible for grilles and ornamental steelwork.

=== Form and facade ===
==== Original residence ====
The original residence has a facade made of limestone. The massing is composed of three parts: a three-story central section and two wings of shorter height. Elaborate pediments decorate the outer wings and the house's former porte-cochère. When the mansion was being constructed, Frick had mandated that a large picture gallery be constructed in the same style as his main house. The gallery wing was placed along 71st Street because it was a narrow side street, while the main mansion was recessed from Fifth Avenue to visually distinguish it from neighboring residences.

The central section is eleven bays wide and faces the garden on Fifth Avenue. Its design was likely influenced by that of the Hôtel du Châtelet in Paris. On the western elevation of the central section's facade, the central three bays of comprise a portico flanked by four double-height pilasters in the Ionic order. A staircase, flanked by urns, rises from the garden into arched doorways at the first story of the portico. The rest of the first floor is clad with rusticated blocks and contains French doors, with carved plaques above each set of doors. A belt course runs horizontally above the first-story windows and extends across to both wings; the belt course doubles as a sill for the second-story windows. The windows on the portico's second story have balustrades. There is also a balustrade above the second story, interspersed with the vertical piers between each bay. The third story is designed to appear like an attic and is set back from the facade.

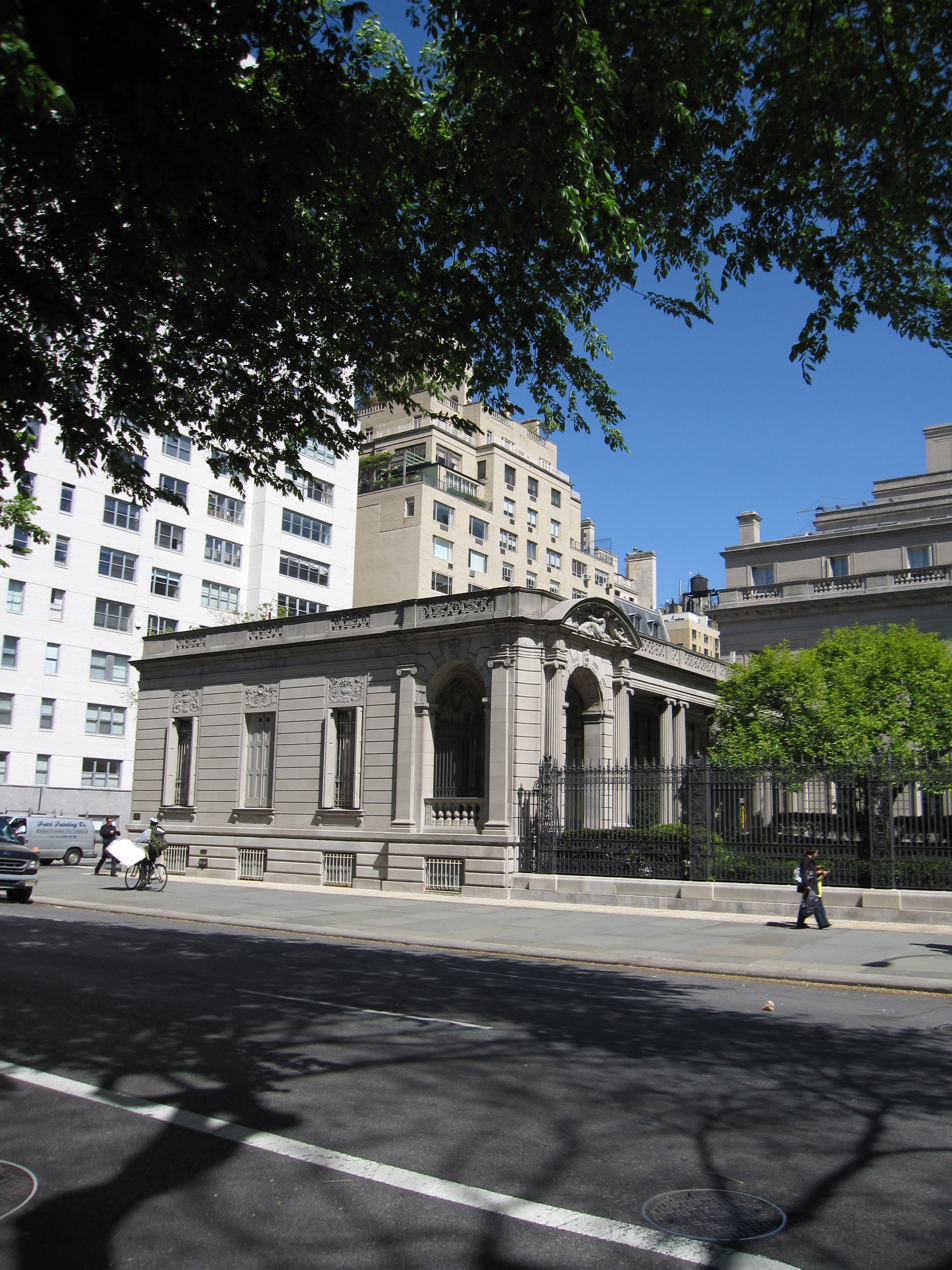
Gallery wing as seen from Fifth Avenue

The north wing is known as the gallery wing and measures 100 by 35 feet (30 by 11 m) across. It extends west to Fifth Avenue and rises one and a half stories. The southern elevation of the north wing is designed like a loggia, with fluted Ionic columns between each bay. The westernmost bay of the loggia has a rusticated facade and an arched window topped by a carved, curved tympanum. The western elevation of the north wing borders Fifth Avenue and is divided into four bays. The southernmost bay on Fifth Avenue contains an arch, while the other three bays on that elevation contain rectangular windows topped by bas-reliefs. The northern elevation of the gallery wing, facing 71st Street, is one story high and is divided into bays by Doric pilasters. Most of the bays on the 71st Street elevation lack windows and are topped by stone plaques. The outermost bays contain archways that are flanked by Ionic pilasters and topped by carved tympana. Attilio Piccirilli designed the two tympana, which were called Orpheus and Sculpture.

The south wing is two stories high and contained the house's porte-cochère. The western elevation of the south wing is two bays wide and protrudes slightly from the central wing. At the first story, the south wing is rusticated, and there are triangular pediments above the western elevation's windows. On the 70th Street (southern) elevation of the south wing, there are rectangular windows topped by bas-reliefs, similar to the facade of the central section. At the far eastern end of the south wing's 70th Street elevation is the museum's main entrance, originally the porte-cochère's entrance, which is topped by an ornate tympanum. The tympanum, sculpted by Sherry Edmundson Fry to designs by the Piccirilli Brothers, depicts a female figure modeled on Audrey Munson. When the house was built, the porte-cochère was set back significantly from the street and was enclosed by a pair of metal gates; a barrel vault led north to another entrance at 71st Street. The rear facade of the house faced the porte-cochère. After the house was converted to a museum in the 1930s, the tympanum above the porte-cochère entrance was moved forward, closer to 70th Street.

==== Additions ====
On the northeastern corner of the site is the Frick Art Reference Library building, designed in the Renaissance Revival style. Its facade faces 71st Street and is adjacent to the northern elevation of the original house's gallery wing. The facade is made of limestone and is designed to appear as though it was six stories high. The lowest two stories are clad with rusticated blocks of limestone. At the center of the ground story is a double-height entrance archway; there are niches on either side of the archway, which themselves are flanked by pilasters. Above the pilasters a cornice connects with the first story of the main residence. The upper stories of the library have plain walls with large windows facing west and north; only the third and sixth floors and the penthouse have windows. The top floors are set back from the street, above an entablature with dentils. A terrace ran along the north and west sides of the penthouse.

On the southeastern corner is the one-story annex that was added in 1977. The annex measures 34 by 91 feet (10 by 28 m) across, with a design based on the Grand Trianon at the Palace of Versailles. The rusticated facade uses Indiana limestone from the quarry that supplied the stone for the original house. The annex's eastern elevation is three bays wide; each bay contains a French door that overlooks Page's garden. Along 70th Street is another annex designed by Annabelle Selldorf. The Selldorf addition consists of two limestone-clad structures, each four stories tall and linked by a glass structure. Atop one of the limestone structures are four additional stories, which are set back from the facade.

=== Interior ===
The British decorator Charles Allom of White, Allom & Co. furnished the rooms on the ground floor and influenced the materials used on that story. Allom also decorated the breakfast room and Frick's personal sitting room on the second floor. Rooms on the second and third floors, as well as two first-floor reception rooms, were decorated by Elsie de Wolfe. Charles Carstairs and Joseph Duveen provided paintings, sculptures, and other decorative objects for the rooms. Frick's wife Adelaide and daughter Helen directed the placement of decorations in the house. A. H. Davenport and Company provided furniture and interior woodwork, fabrics, wall coverings, and decorative paintings. In addition, the Interior Metal Manufacturing Company was hired to construct over 200 hollow-steel doors for the interior.

The mansion contains about 40 rooms, including spaces that were added when the building became a museum. The New York City Department of City Planning cites the house as having a gross floor area of 197,400 ft^{2} (18,340 m^{2}). Throughout the house are surfaces made of stone, wood, or marble. Various types of marble were used, and many of the walls were made of marble, including those on the upper stories. Marble was used in the foyer, vestibules, and halls, while Austrian oak was used in the gallery and Frick's sitting room. Ornamental features such as dados, paneling, pilasters, and cornices are spread throughout the house. When the house became a museum, artworks were placed on display based on how they blended in with the house's ambiance. There are bookcases placed throughout the Frick House's rooms, as well as tapestries, wooden furniture, and bronze decorations. The Fragonard and Boucher rooms are named based on the artworks that they displayed. In addition, there are glass skylights and laylights above some of the galleries, which disperse light across the rooms.

==== First story ====
There are 16 rooms on the first floor. Originally, the main entrance was from the portico leading to the garden on Fifth Avenue. The hallways are arranged in an axial plan, with north and south halls linking with west-east corridors on either end. The resulting floor plan resembles a letter Z. Mark Allen Hewitt et al., the authors of the book Carrere and Hastings, Architects, wrote that the axial plan may have been necessitated by the fact that Frick wanted a large picture gallery extending westward from the north end of the building.

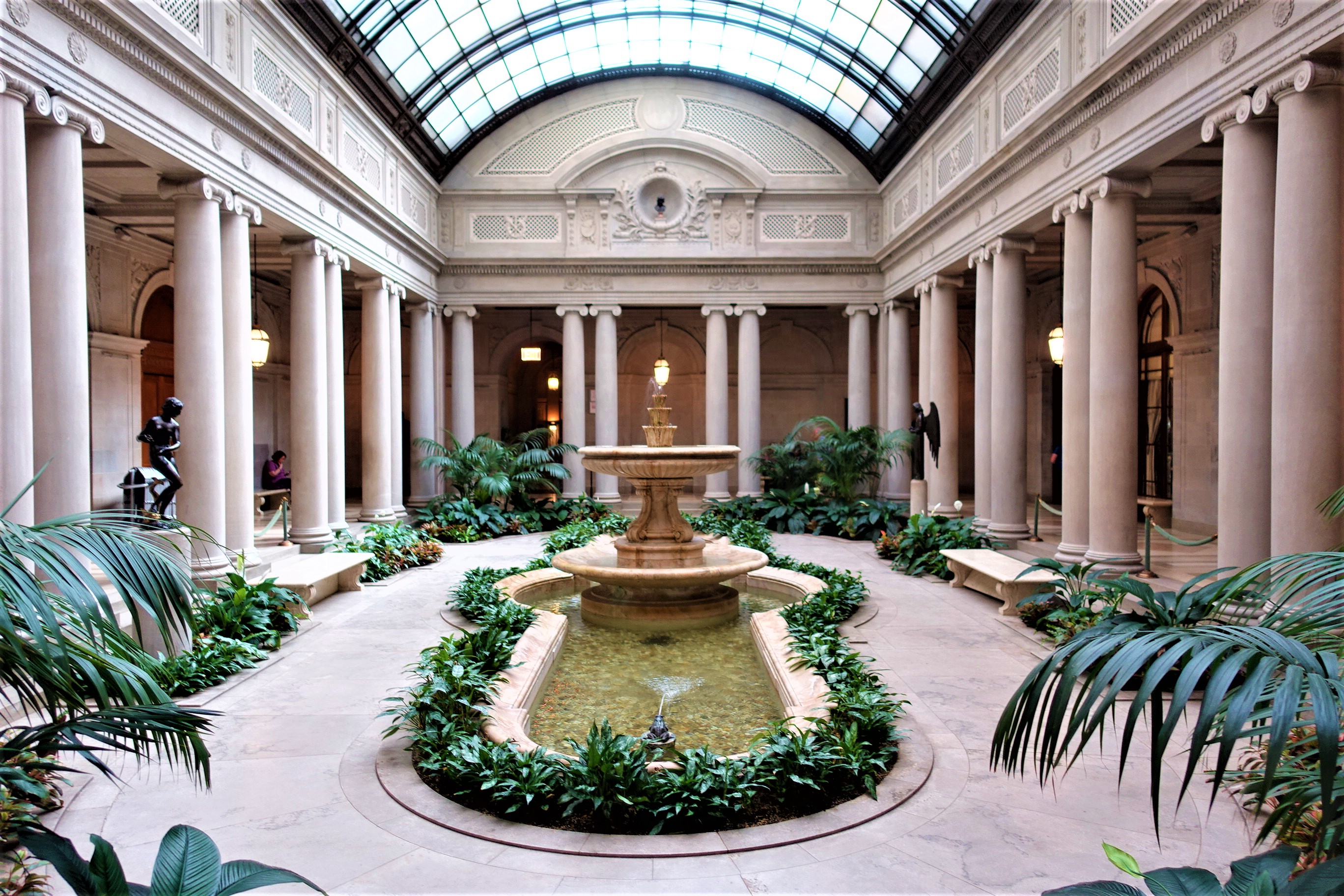
Garden court

At the center of the house is the 30-by-41-foot (9.1 by 12.5 m) living hall flanked by a 43 ft × 26 ft (13.1 m × 7.9 m) library room to the north and a 32 ft × 26 ft (9.8 m × 7.9 m) drawing room to the south. The living hall has oak paneling and classical design details and originally functioned as a gathering space. The drawing room is also known as the Fragonard room, since it contains large wall paintings by Jean-Honoré Fragonard, and is furnished with 18th-century French furniture and Sèvres porcelain. The library room is designed in the William and Mary style with wooden paneling and originally had low bookcases. To the east of the library and drawing rooms are the north and south halls respectively. The north hall, central living hall, and south hall form a transverse corridor that is divided into three parts by aedicular doorways.

Near the southern end of the house was another entrance from the porte-cochère, which opened onto the eastern wall of the south hall; the porte-cochère entrance was replaced with the entrance hall when the house was converted into a museum. The entrance hall has marble walls and a ceiling carved by the Piccirilli Brothers. There is also a staircase hall just north of the former porte-cochère entrance. Within the staircase hall is a marble stair with an ornate wrought iron balustrade, patterned after a similar railing at St Paul's Cathedral in London. On the staircase hall's landing is a large Aeolian pipe organ, which is played on occasion; the organ is housed in a case with spiraling colonnettes carved out of Verona marble. A hallway extends west from the porte-cochère entrance, separating the dining room to the south from the other rooms to the north. The dining room occupies the southwest corner of the south wing and is designed in the Georgian style, with wooden panels. After the museum opened, a former pantry next to the dining room was converted to the Boucher room, named after the François Boucher paintings on the walls.

The gallery wing was designed so that, if a fire arose in the rest of the home, it would not spread to the artwork in that wing. The west gallery took up almost the entire gallery wing, except for a small enamel room that was removed in the 1930s. The west gallery has a skylight running its entire length, in addition to small skylights above each painting. A colonnaded loggia faces the Fifth Avenue garden to the south and contains a bluestone floor and paired columns. The loggia was converted into the portico gallery in 2011, after a glass wall was installed. The west gallery also has decorations such as an ornate entablature and a coffered ceiling. Adjacent to the west gallery was Frick's office, also removed in the 1930s. The office was accessed through a hallway leading to the north hall.

At the north end of the house, a garden court, oval room, music room, and east gallery were built in 1935. The covered garden court has a marble floor and a colonnade supporting a glass roof; there is a sunken garden with marble fountain in the center. The oval room is just north of the garden court, between the west and east galleries. The east gallery has a skylight, as well as arched doorways with carved keystones; Both the east gallery and the oval room are decorated with five types of wood. There was a music room east of the garden court and south of the east gallery; the circular space had a domed skylight and could fit 147 people. At the south end was a waiting room added in 1977, which measured 54 by 16 feet (16.5 by 4.9 m) and had various chandeliers and moldings. As part of the 2020s renovation, the waiting room was replaced by an enlarged reception hall with a marble staircase, while the music room was replaced with three gallery rooms.

==== Other stories ====
The second floor contained the family's private living spaces such as the bedrooms, the women's boudoir, sitting rooms, the breakfast room, and guest rooms. There are 14 rooms on the second story. Its layout is similar to the first story, but the second floor extends only across the central and south wings. Henry had a bedroom facing Fifth Avenue, which had dark woodwork. His adjacent sitting room is known as the Walnut Room because of its wood paneling. Adelaide had a bedroom and boudoir facing the avenue, designed with Louis XIV style and Louis XV style furnishings. Helen also had her bedroom overlooking the avenue, as well as a private library across the hall from her father's sitting room. Other rooms on that floor were designed with a lighter color palette, including guest rooms designed by De Wolfe. The second-floor hallways include cove lighting and ceilings with Chinoiserie murals. The third floor had rooms for about 27 servants.

When the house became a museum, the upper floors were originally used as staff offices. Ten of the second-floor rooms were converted to galleries as part of an early-2020s renovation. The new galleries retain the second-floor rooms' dimensions, which are smaller than those of the first-floor rooms. Also as part of the 2020s renovation, a mezzanine with a shop and a cafe was added to the reception hall.

The large basement contained the kitchen and service areas. A wing contained the billiard room and bowling alley, which were decorated in the Jacobean style with ornate strapwork ceilings. The bowling alley was built by the Brunswick-Balke-Collender Company in 1914. During the 1920s and early 1930s, the Frick Art Reference Library was housed in the bowling alley until they moved to a new structure next door at 10 East 71st Street. The bowling alley was seldom used afterward; it still exists as of 2025 but is closed to the public. Also in the basement is a 30-by-80-foot (9.1 by 24.4 m), reinforced-concrete storage vault that was constructed in the 1940s. The vault contains 98,550 cubic feet (2,791 m^{3}) of storage space on three levels, as well as walls measuring 1 foot (0.30 m) thick and a roof measuring 3 feet (0.91 m) thick. A basement auditorium with approximately 220 seats was built in the 2020s. Known as the Stephen A. Schwarzman Auditorium, it is shaped similarly to a clamshell and replaced three levels of storage vaults.

==== Library annex ====
The library annex is cited as having six or seven full stories. Including mezzanine levels, it has a total of 13 stories. Two of these levels are below ground. Most of the levels were devoted almost exclusively to library stacks and were only 7.17 feet (2.19 m) high to reduce the number of steps that visitors needed to climb. Each level was supported by the shelves below it, which doubled as pillars. When the current library opened in 1935, it had an internal telephone system, a telautograph system from which the librarian could request books from staff, and a book conveyor. There was a climate-control system that kept the objects at a consistent temperature.

In addition to stacks, the library includes offices, reading rooms, and librarian's office. The current library originally had a marble vestibule at the ground level. The third story had a main reading room, which could fit 40 people and was originally described as measuring 37 by 50 feet (11 by 15 m), with marble finishes and walnut paneling. This reading room had a frieze depicting the heads of two dogs that belonged to Helen Frick. The third floor also had a paneled librarian's office, as well as a smaller reading room with storage cupboards and Jacobean chandeliers. The other staff offices were on the sixth story, and there was a lounge and cafeteria at the penthouse level. There were two penthouse lounges, both decorated with art.

== History ==
Henry Clay Frick was born in 1849 and gained his wealth through the coke and steel industries. Frick cofounded the Carnegie Steel Company with Andrew Carnegie and also became an avid art collector. After moving to Pittsburgh and marrying Adelaide Howard Childs in 1881, Frick began thinking of developing a "millionaire's castle". By the end of the 19th century, Frick and Carnegie's partnership had become strained, and Frick sold off his stake in the Carnegie Steel Company. When the Frick family moved from Pittsburgh to New York City in 1905, they obtained a 10-year lease on the William H. Vanderbilt House at 640 Fifth Avenue, with which Frick had long been fascinated. At that time, Fifth Avenue north of 59th Street was generally occupied by private residences, although hotels and clubhouses were scattered throughout. Frick also bought land at Prides Crossing, Massachusetts, in 1902 and completed their Eagle Rock estate there three years later. The family lived at the Vanderbilt House for a decade, using Eagle Rock as a summer house.

=== Development ===
==== Land acquisition ====
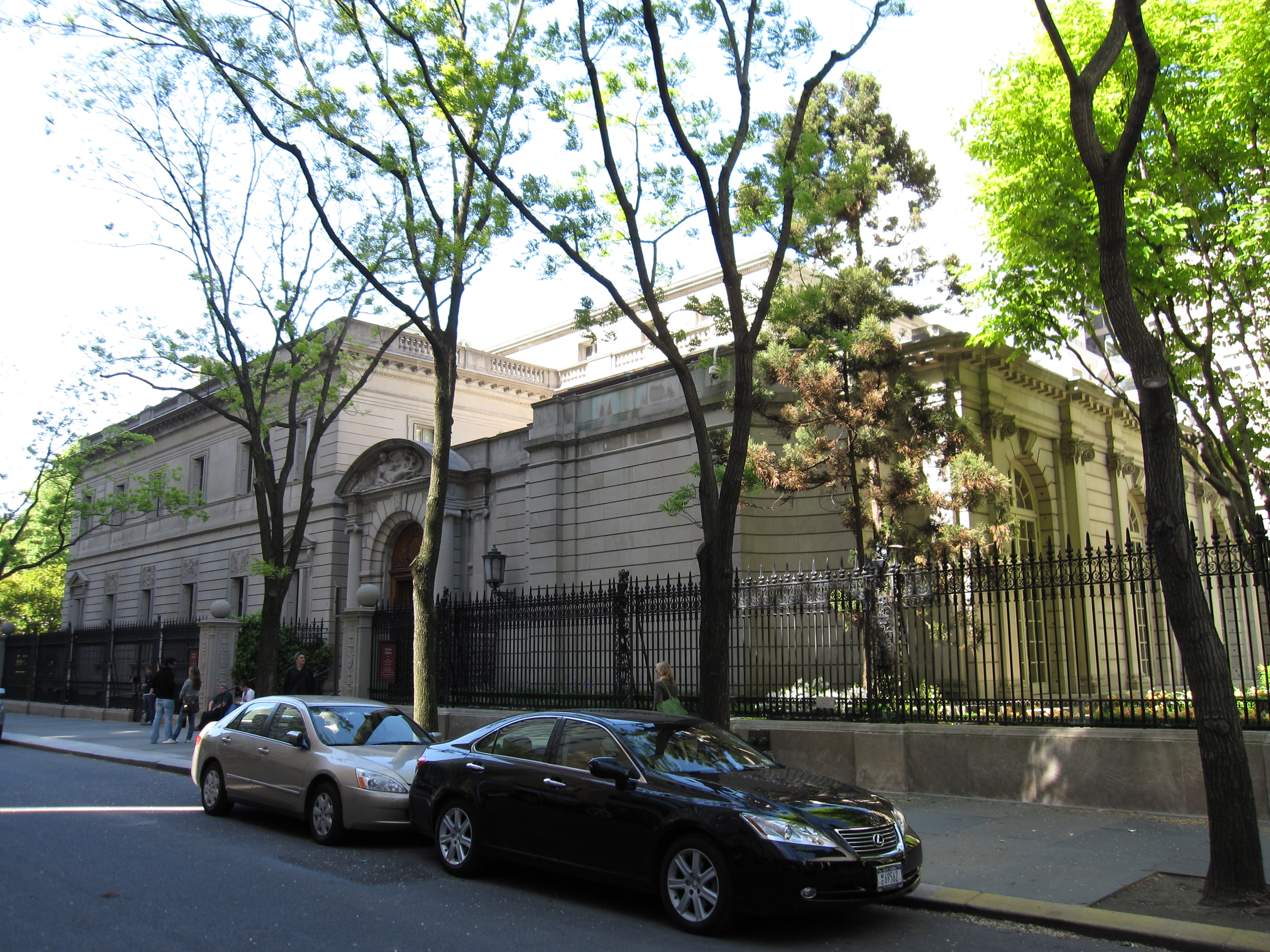
The house as seen from 70th Street

After Frick unsuccessfully tried to acquire the Vanderbilt House, he began looking for another residence, since the Vanderbilt Mansion did not meet his personal criteria for a house that was "always the best". Frick expressed interest in a site on the east side of Fifth Avenue between 70th and 71st streets, which housed the Lenox Library. The library building occupied a 200-by-125-foot (61 by 38 m) site. The site was about a mile south of the Andrew Carnegie Mansion, built for Frick's partner-turned-rival in 1902. Although an urban legend posits that Frick had promised to "make Carnegie's place look like a miner's shack", there is no evidence that Frick ever said these words. Rather, Frick may have become interested in the library site because it was higher than the neighboring blocks were.

The library was suffering financially and was looking for someone to buy its land. Lewis Cass Ledyard, a trustee of the Lenox estate, reportedly chose to sell to Frick because the latter was willing to buy a large site. In December 1906, news media reported that Frick had acquired ten lots on the Lenox Library site for almost $2.5 million. (Note: Colin B. Bailey and Kate Lemos et al. write that the initial acquisition of lots cost $2.25 million and measured 200 by 125 ft (61 by 38 m). The New York Times reported that Frick had acquired the entire city block for $2.4 million.) At the time, the Lenox site could not be used as anything other than a library, due to restrictions implemented by James Lenox before he died in 1880. There was also uncertainty over who controlled a 50-foot-wide (15 m) strip just east of the library building, which the New York City government had acquired when the Lenox Library merged with the New York Public Library (NYPL) system. James Lenox's will stipulated that the strip would revert to the Lenox estate if that land ceased to be used as a library.

The New York State Legislature passed a law in February 1907, which allowed the Lenox estate to make arrangements for selling off the site of the library. Frick agreed to buy the 50-foot strip east of the library that April; the purchase cost him $600,000. He took title to the strip in January 1908. This gave Frick control of a 200-by-175-foot (61 by 53 m) site. However, he could not take title to the Lenox Library plot until the NYPL's Main Branch—where the Lenox Library's holdings were to be relocated—was completed. Frick thus waited until the NYPL's trustees could relocate their books from the Lenox Library. By the early 1910s, Frick seldom lived at his Vanderbilt Mansion residence when he was in New York City.

==== Selection of architect ====
The New-York Tribune reported in May 1907 that Frick was rumored to have hired C. P. H. Gilbert to draw up initial plans for the house. By 1908, Frick was negotiating with Daniel Burnham, who had previously designed the Frick Building in downtown Pittsburgh. Originally, Frick was going to hire Burnham to design either an annex to the Eagle Rock estate or a new building on the Lenox Library site. Frick wrote to Burnham in June 1908, asking whether Burnham would be willing to "talk about the Lenox Library site". After studying houses in Europe, Burnham wrote back to Frick in February 1909, saying that he planned to use two London mansions, Bridgewater House and Stafford House, as models for the new house. Burnham submitted a design for an 18th-century Italian palazzo. No further progress was made until the NYPL's Main Branch was completed in 1911. Concurrently, Frick was developing a picture gallery in his home at Eagle Rock. Frick asked two of his art-collector friends, Benjamin Altman and Peter Arrell Browne Widener, to advise on the dimensions of the Eagle Rock gallery.

Frick ultimately decided not to hire Burnham to design the New York house, and Burnham died shortly afterward; sources disagree on the reasoning behind Frick's decision. According to Frick Collection director Colin B. Bailey, the impetus was a letter from Widener; according to Mark Alan Hewitt et al., it was another friend, the art dealer Joseph Duveen, who advised Frick to hire someone else. In January 1912, Frick instead decided to hire Thomas Hastings, who had just designed the NYPL Main Branch and Knoedler & Company, the dealership where Frick bought most of his art. Charles Carstairs of Knoedler & Co., one of Frick's close associates, wrote to Frick that February, saying that he and Hastings had devised a dozen plans for Frick's new house. Frick paid Hastings $101,000 upfront and another $42,000 over the next three years for additional work. Carstairs helped Frick curate the art and decorative objects in the new house.

==== Design process ====
Much of Frick's correspondence with Hastings was handled by Frick's secretary, James Howard Bridge. Frick wanted Hastings to develop a house that would eventually become a public museum for his art collection, similar to the Wallace Collection in London and the Isabella Stewart Gardner Museum in Boston. This was poorly communicated to Hastings, who was initially unaware of the museum plan. Hastings initially devised a plan for a square residence surrounding a central courtyard, as well as a picture gallery facing east, but Frick disapproved of these plans. Hastings had revised his plans by April 1912, to which Frick gave his approval. The residence was proposed as an L-shaped building, with design elements that were "kept simple and conservative in every way". The plans included a guest house to the southeast and a servants' wing to the northeast of the main house, in addition to an art gallery.

Frick formally took title to the Lenox Library plot on May 21, 1912, and the Lenox Library's demolition was announced five days later. Frick offered to move the Lenox Library building to the site of the Arsenal in Central Park shortly thereafter. The Municipal Art Commission approved the Lenox Library's relocation that June, drawing protests from numerous civic and social groups, and Frick withdrew his offer the same month due to the opposition. Drawings and a model of the proposed house had been finished by mid-1912. and Frick asked Widener to review Hastings's plans. Hastings went to England that August to show Carstairs the model and to look at the interiors of other mansions for inspiration.

==== Construction ====
Workers began razing the Lenox Library in July 1912, and the site had been cleared by October. Hastings had completed his designs by January 1913 and submitted his plans to the New York City Department of Buildings that month. Construction contracts for the house were also awarded that month. Frick set a construction budget of $3 million (equivalent to $100 million in 2025) for his house. (Note: The New York Times cited the cost as being between $2 million and $3 million.) making it among the city's most expensive residences of the time. Including the land, the house was expected to cost $5.5 million, more than Carnegie's, Schwab's, J.P. Morgan's, or William A. Clark's houses. Hastings had to revise the plans multiple times to keep the project within its budget. The construction contract stipulated that the house had to be completed within 18 months of the groundbreaking, as Frick's lease of the Vanderbilt Mansion was supposed to expire in September 1914. Work on the house's foundation was completed in early 1913, and the steel frame, facade, and roof were all constructed between April and June of that year.

In March 1913, Hastings published details of the decorations that he planned to install in the main living areas, though Frick disapproved of some of the more elaborate decorations. Instead, Frick hired the British decorator Charles Allom to design simpler interiors. Although Hastings did not generally object to Allom's suggestions to simplify the ornamentation, Frick had Carstairs moderate any disagreements that arose. Frick did allow Hastings to decorate the interiors in marble and oak. The balustrade on the staircase was among the only design details to which Allom did not suggest modifications. Construction proceeded ahead of schedule throughout the year, despite mishaps including a worker's death. The floor arches and gallery roof were being built by mid-1913, and the interiors were being plastered by that September. According to Bailey, construction supervisor D. B. Kinch claimed that his men "had not worked one hour of overtime". Frick wrote in October 1913 that the windows were being installed, and the Piccirilli Brothers designed statuary for the house the next month. Early the following March, George Washington Vanderbilt II—who had owned Frick's old residence, the Vanderbilt Mansion—died. Cornelius Vanderbilt III inherited the mansion and requested that Frick vacate it.

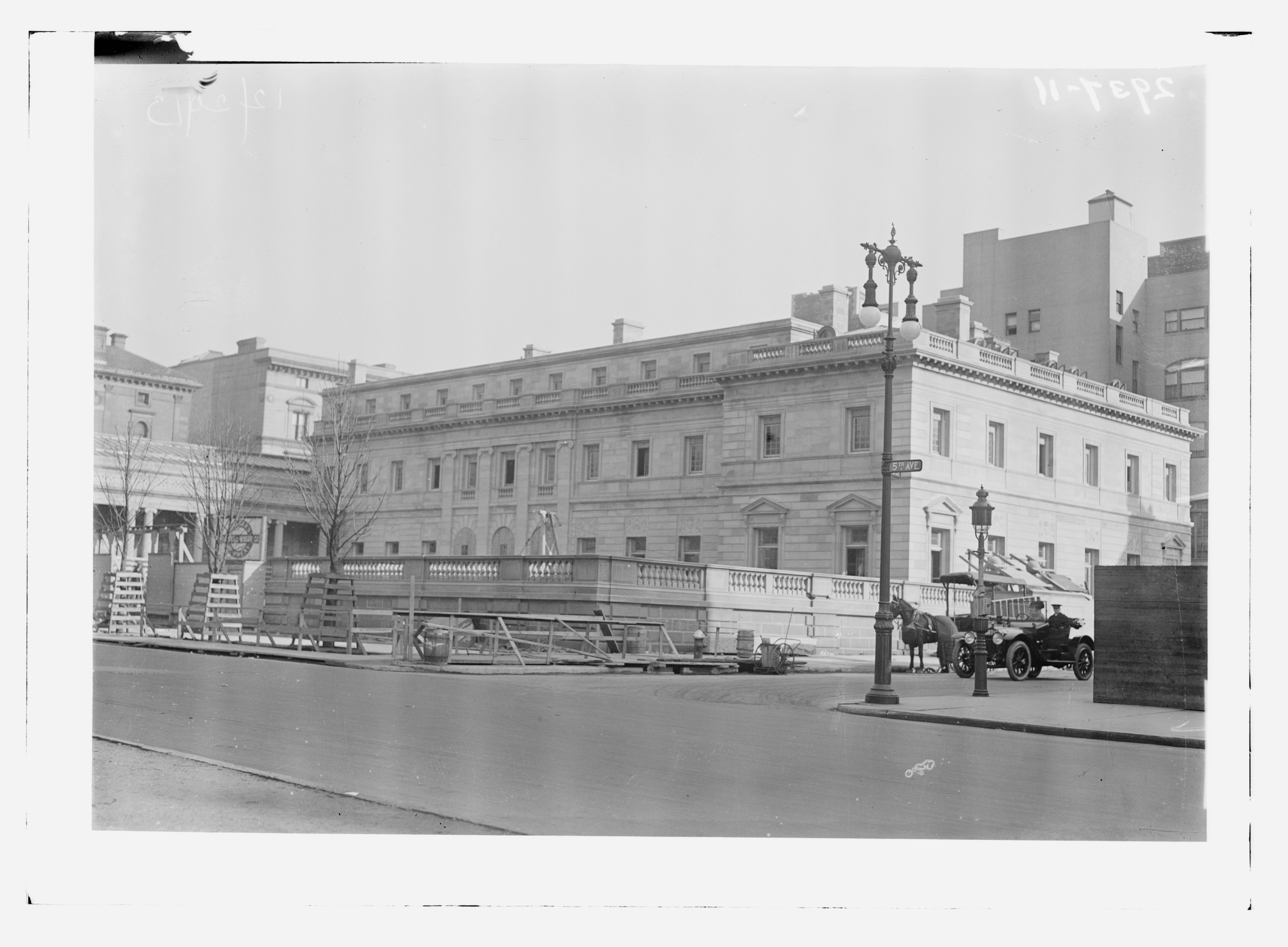
The house shortly before completion in 1913

Cornelius Vanderbilt's eviction notice forced a greater urgency in the Frick Mansion's completion. Frick initially did not want to integrate antique furniture and fine art into the house, but he may have changed his mind after seeing decorations owned by J. P. Morgan at the Metropolitan Museum of Art in early 1914. Frick hired the decorator Elsie de Wolfe to furnish some of the interiors after she wrote him a letter offering to help furnish the house. Frick himself mediated disputes that arose between Allom and de Wolfe, especially after de Wolfe expressed interest in designing some of Allom's rooms. By that May, The New York Times reported that the Frick House was "rapidly nearing completion". That month alone, Frick acquired large amounts of European fine art for his residence and hired Jacques Seligmann to transport furniture from John Murray Scott's house in Paris. Though there were reports that Frick spent $100,000 to import a pipe organ for the house, Colin B. Bailey writes that he had paid $40,000 for an Aeolian organ. Frick hired the British organist Easthope Martin to play the organ at his new house following a trip to London. For his fountain, Frick examined eighteen 10-ton blocks of marble before finding one that he deemed satisfactory.

The Fricks' belongings had all been moved to the new house by June 1914. At the time, De Wolfe wrote that she anticipated the house to be completed on September 1, but this timeline was pushed back. Frick became seriously ill, forcing him to remain at his home in Massachusetts during August 1914. The onset of World War I in Europe—despite Frick's initial belief that it would not "seriously injure investments" in the U.S.—also resulted in material and labor shortages at the plants where Frick was getting his material. Frick wrote angry letters to Allom, accusing him of being "unbusinesslike" and blaming him for delays in delivery. For example, when notified about war-related delays in late 1914, Frick wrote: "War excuse absurd." In another case, when Allom requested that workers in France be paid in advance due to the war, Frick refused the request "with a bluntness that bordered on insensitivity". In total, the house was estimated to have cost $5 million.

=== Frick residence ===
The Frick family moved into the house starting on November 16, 1914, and the first photographs of the house were published in Architecture magazine that month. Frick, his wife Adelaide Howard Childs, and their daughter Helen Clay Frick initially lived in the house; their son Childs, who was already married, never resided in the house. At the time, the property was worth $3.1 million including land, making it one of the most valuable structures in the neighborhood. The mansion occupied one of the largest privately owned pieces of land in Manhattan.

==== Early years ====
As late as November 18, Frick complained that the house had doors without locks, a breakfast room without a table, and a sitting room without any furniture whatsoever. Frick and his suppliers were involved in disagreements; for example, he refused to pay transport charges for furniture he bought from Seligmann, and Frick told Allom that he would have rather had de Wolfe furnish the whole house. Frick wrote a letter to Hastings in mid-1915, saying: "I think [the house] is a great monument to you, but it is only because I restrained you from excess ornamentation." In the same letter, Frick criticized Hastings for the cost overruns.

Frick hosted his first dinners at the house in early 1915, inviting U.S. Steel executives, art collectors, art industry figures, and industrialists; the family typically hosted two formal dinners in the dining room every week. Frick also bought additional art for the mansion. He bought 14 Fragonard panels from the Met's Morgan exhibition and moved them to the drawing room, which was enlarged to accommodate the Fragonard panels. Joseph Duveen arranged for a Parisian decorator to create a maquette for the Fragonard room, where Frick intended to showcase Duveen's furnishings and Morgan's artwork. Frick acquired pieces such as Hans Holbein's portrait of Thomas Cromwell, and he also owned paintings by such artists as El Greco, Francisco Goya, Frans Hals, Rembrandt, George Romney, Titian, Anthony van Dyck, and Diego Velázquez. Frick decorated the mansion with other objects as well, including furniture, carpets, tapestries, sculptures, and bronzes. His decorators continued to work on the house through the middle of 1915, and he finalized his will at the same time, bequeathing the house to public use after his death. Census records from 1915 showed that the family lived with 27 servants, including several butlers, footmen, chambermaids, cooks, and laundresses.

Frick had wanted his Fragonard Room to be completed at the beginning of November 1915, but it was not completed until the following May. By June 1916, Frick had paid Duveen $4.696 million just to acquire art from Morgan's estate. Frick separately acquired more art, such as Gainsborough's painting Mall, four Boucher panels, Van Dyck's Countess of Clanbrazil, and a Gilbert Stuart portrait of George Washington. He modified his house to display these pieces; for example, he raised the ceiling of Adelaide's boudoir to fit the Boucher panels in late 1916. Forty paintings were displayed at the house by 1917, and Frick also acquired porcelains, sculptures, and furniture near the end of his life. After Duveen decorated the rooms, he convinced Frick to buy even more objects. According to Frick's granddaughter Martha Frick Symington Sanger, he "would often step silently in [the west gallery], observe the observers, and [...] steal out again, unnoticed."

In the late 1910s, the mansion was used for events such as annual meetings, and it temporary housed visiting envoys. During World War I, Frick offered his New York City house as a field hospital in case the city was targeted by an air raid. In the last two years of his life (1918 and 1919), Frick stayed at the house for either 413 or 416 days. He retained his summer estate in Eagle Rock, Massachusetts, where he spent much of the rest of his time, and another residence in Pittsburgh, where he was registered to vote. Toward the end of his life, Frick continued to acquire art. Duveen loaned paintings and marble busts, which were installed on the first floor while Frick decided whether to acquire these works. One visitor, the art dealer René Gimpel, said the house's servants were "dressed from head to foot in black" while the carpet in the gallery wing was "as soft as moss".

==== Unbuilt expansion and Frick's death ====
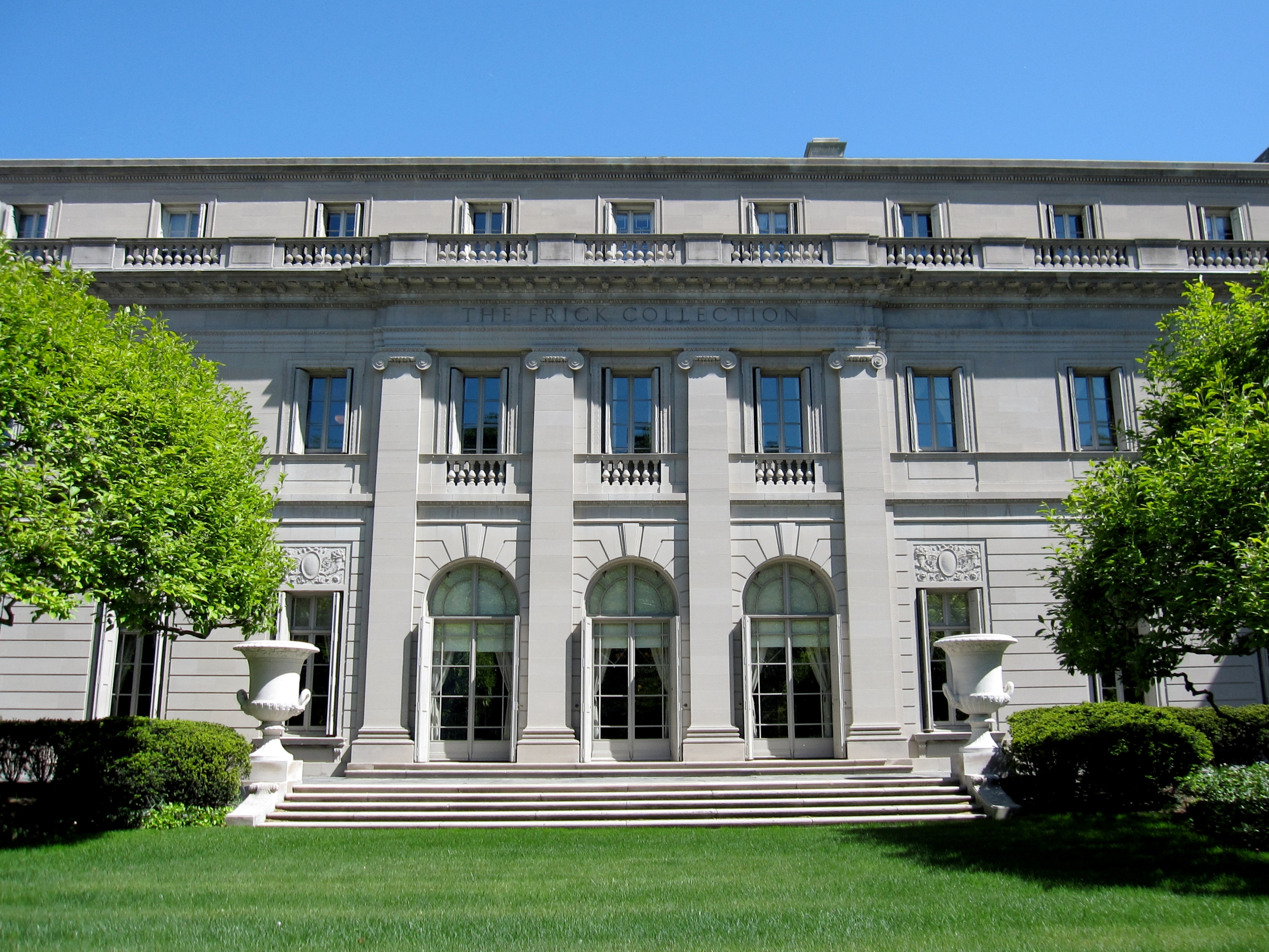
Exterior portico on Fifth Avenue

In November 1915, Frick bought two sites at 6 and 8 East 71st Street adjoining his residence, measuring a combined 50 by 100 feet (15 by 30 m), from the banker Harold B. Thorne. Hastings devised plans to extend the gallery and erect another entrance there. The plans were drawn up with the utmost secrecy, and even Duveen did not learn about the expansion plans until American Art News magazine reported on it in March 1916. Hastings's proposal called for a six-bay-wide, one-story annex with a secondary entrance hall, oval room, sculpture hall, and gallery, which would have been designed in a similar style to the main house. Frick abandoned these plans in 1917 due to rising costs caused by World War I-era shortages, and a fence was installed around the empty sites. Hastings charged Frick $45,000 for the plans; Frick originally refused to pay but eventually agreed to pay about half that amount.

After Frick contracted a foodborne illness in November 1919, one of his last acts was to return objects that Duveen had loaned to the house. Frick died at the house on December 2, 1919, of a heart attack caused by his illness, having lived there for only five years. His funeral was hosted at the house the next day. As stated in his will, Frick's art collection was to be turned over to the public "in due time"; the collection had cost Frick at least $10 million to acquire during his lifetime. His widow Adelaide continued living in the mansion with their daughter Helen. In accordance with Frick's will, if Adelaide died or moved away, the house would be converted to a public museum. Frick also provided a $15 million endowment for the art collection. Nine people were named as trustees of Frick's estate; these included Adelaide, Helen, and Childs Frick, in addition to two art collectors and two sons of art collectors.

When Frick died, he was estimated to have spent $17 million on the building alone. When Frick's estate was appraised in 1920, the mansion and its objects inside were valued at $13 million. Following a dispute between the New York and Pennsylvania state governments over his estate, a court determined that Frick's legal residence had been his Pittsburgh house, not his New York City mansion. A reappraisal of Frick's estate in 1923 found that the mansion was worth $3.25 million without its contents.

==== Adelaide and Helen Frick use ====
Shortly after Frick died, the board of trustees of his estate moved to incorporate the Frick Collection Inc. Hastings agreed to sell the plans for the unbuilt annex to Frick's estate in January 1920 for $25,360, and the board organized the Frick Art Reference Library at the house that year. Originally, Helen Frick used the house's bowling alley as storage space, and the library's staff worked in the main house's basement. After the Frick trustees voted in December 1922 to approve a separate library building, Hastings filed plans for a dedicated library building adjacent to the original mansion in 1923, with a projected cost of $139,000. This library was one story high, with two subbasements, and occupied the site of Frick's unbuilt annex. Its facade was similar to the sculpture wing of the unbuilt annex.

The Frick Art Reference Library next to the main mansion opened in June 1924. As built, the stoop outside the library's front entrance had no landing, which put anyone standing on the stoop at risk of being hit by the door when it opened. As such, the front door had to be installed in reverse. The design of the front door, and other design flaws, led Helen and Adelaide Frick to write angry letters to Hastings, including one letter in 1926 in which Helen vowed never to hire Hastings for another project. Some of the earliest photographic documentation of the interior was taken in 1927 by Frick Art Reference Library photographer Ira W. Martin. Even when Adelaide Frick was alive, there were plans to expand the library. In April 1929, Helen hired Walter Dabney Blair to design a two-story addition to the library, which the board of trustees voted down. Helen, in turn, rejected her brother Childs's suggestion that windows be installed in the walls of the north and south halls and the Fragonard room.

=== Conversion to museum ===
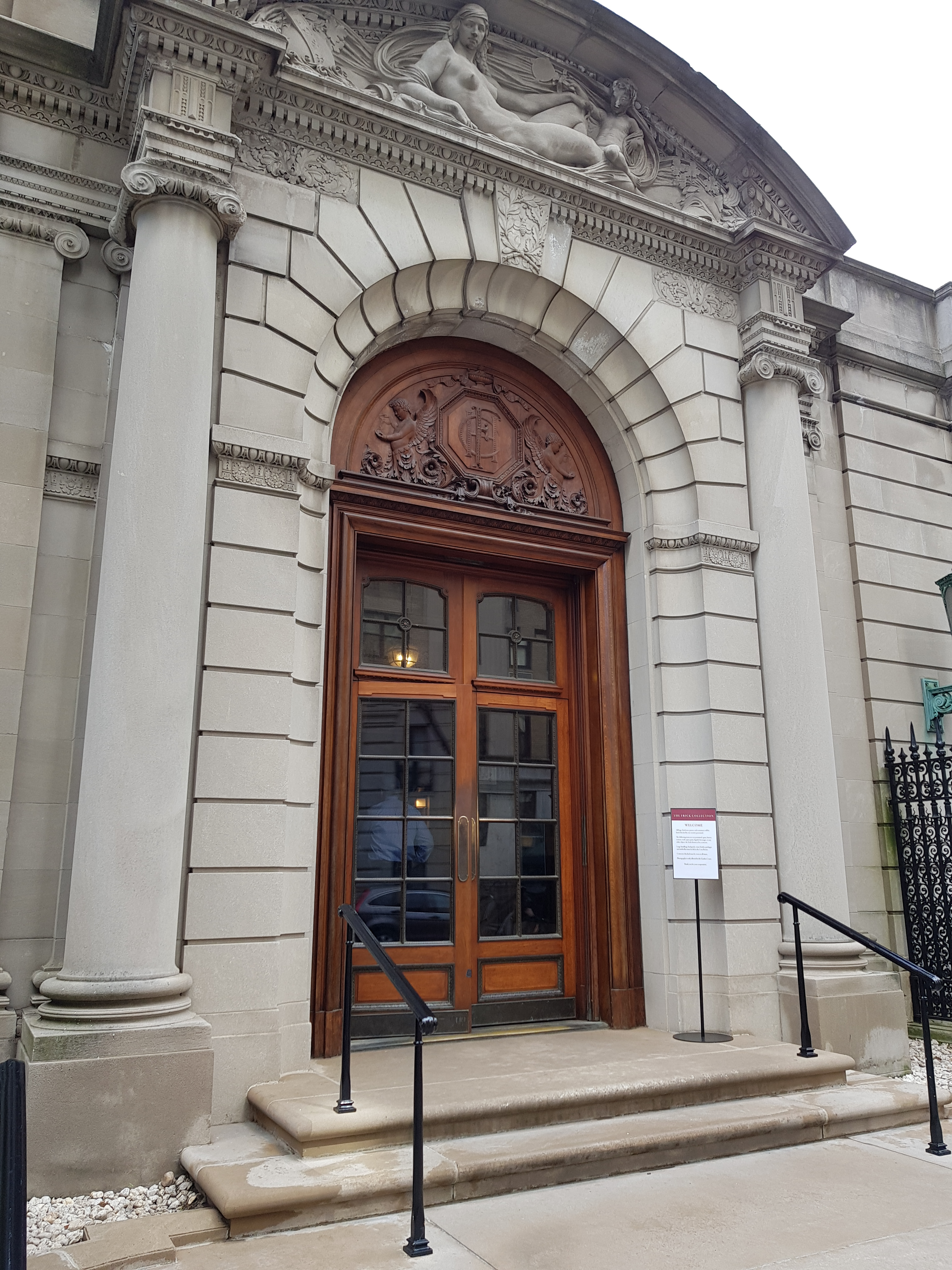
Entrance on 70th Street, modified as part of the 1930s renovation

Adelaide Frick's death in October 1931 triggered a clause in her husband's will, which gave the trustees permission to open the house and the art collection to the public. When she died, her possessions at the 70th Street mansion were valued at nearly $129,000. By the end of October 1931, the art historian Frederick Mortimer Clapp (who would become the Frick Collection museum's first director) had presented five proposals for a museum on the house's first and second floors. Although Helen Frick moved her possessions out of the house the next month, the trustees did not immediately move to convert the house into a museum. Despite initial reports that the house could be opened to the public in several months, this estimate was highly optimistic. The trustees invited Delano and Aldrich and John Russell Pope to devise designs for an enlarged house. Childs Frick wanted to hire Delano and Aldrich. Pope was the first choice of three of the other trustees, two of whom were already familiar with Pope's work. (Note: Specifically, Andrew W. Mellon, John D. Rockefeller Jr., and Joseph Duveen preferred to hire Pope. Rockefeller had invited Pope to submit a design for the Cloisters museum in Upper Manhattan in 1929, and Duveen had encouraged Pope to design two galleries at the British Museum.)

The house was completely closed for the next two years while the family mourned. The Frick trustees hired Pope to renovate the mansion in March 1932. Pope's original plan called for constructing a glass roof above the rear courtyard, removing the porte-cochère, and erecting a new entrance on 70th Street. The initial proposal did not include modifications to the original library; consequently, any expansion of the mansion at its northeast corner was constrained, and Pope's first plan called for only one additional gallery. By January 1933, the trustees anticipated that the collection would likely open to the public as a museum within a year. Shortly afterward, the trustees acquired two additional lots at 10 and 12 East 71st Street. Pope filed plans for a storage vault in February 1933. The trustees approved a revised plan for the mansion and adjacent library in May, at an estimated cost of $1.941 million, and Pope filed plans that June for a rebuilt seven-story art reference library at 6–12 East 71st Street.

Work on the mansion began in December 1933, but the opening of the museum was delayed because of "unexpected difficulties". In particular, workers reconstructed the foundation and convert the private spaces for public use. The existing furnishings were wrapped in protective sheeting, and passageways were shuttered to prevent theft. Almost all of the rooms were renovated, except for one room preserved in its original condition; most of the modifications concerned circulation improvements. The rear courtyard was converted into the enclosed garden court, a pantry became the Boucher room, and the porte-cochère was replaced with the entrance hall. The oval room, music room, and east gallery were built at the north end of the house, designed in a similar style to the original structure. Workers built a storage vault in the basement to host the collection's most valuable objects, and the collection was stored in the vault while work proceeded. The original library wing closed in November 1934, and the new library was built above the existing library wing, which was then demolished. The new library included a reading room, librarian's apartment, and additional stacks.

=== Museum use ===
==== 1930s to 1970s ====
The rebuilt six-story library opened in January 1935. The Frick Collection itself (known as the Frick) had a soft opening on December 11, 1935; it officially opened to the public five days later on December 16. When the museum opened, its entrance was through the new entrance hall on 70th Street. Originally, visitors were required to follow a specific path, but this rule was dropped by 1937. Despite the Frick family's description of the house as a "former residence" housing the Frick Collection, many visitors called the building a "'mansion' being used as a 'museum'". Museum officials filed plans for a concrete vault under the Frick House in March 1941. The vault doubled as an art storage facility and a bomb shelter, as there were concerns that the house could be targeted by air raids during World War II. The Frick Collection also bought two adjacent buildings during the 1940s. Museum officials bought the six-story townhouse at 9 East 70th Street in 1940, and it acquired the seven-story townhouse at 7 East 70th Street in 1947. Number 7 was replaced with a service wing, while number 9 was used as storage space.

Beginning in 1957, the Frick House's facade and garden were illuminated nightly. The Frick Collection's occupancy of the Frick House preserved it through the mid-20th century, especially when other mansions on Fifth Avenue's Millionaires' Row were being demolished. As part of a master plan in 1967, the Frick Collection's trustees drew up plans for an annex at 7 and 9 East 70th Street, designed in the same style as the Frick House. At the time, the house at 5 East 70th Street was still standing, so the annex would have been physically separated from the Frick House itself. The Frick Collection acquired the neighboring Widener House at 5 East 70th Street in 1972, thus completing its acquisition of land on 70th Street. The museum planned to construct an annex at 5–9 East 70th Street, which would have included offices, lab space, lecture halls, and an auditorium. At the time, the house could accommodate only 250 people at once.

The museum announced plans to demolish the Widener House in March 1973. The Widener House's demolition was delayed after the New York City Landmarks Preservation Commission (LPC) both requested the museum obtain a certificate of appropriateness for the demolition and designated the Frick House itself as a landmark. The museum announced plans that June for a "temporary garden" and terrace on the 70th Street lots, which the LPC approved the next month. The annex was canceled that November. After the Widener House had been razed, Frick Collection officials announced plans in May 1974 for a one-story wing, replacing the terrace. The wing cost $2.11 million, and the museum also spent $2.85 million on mechanical upgrades. The expansion was completed in 1977, with lecture rooms, storage space, waiting room, card shop, cloakroom, auditorium, and library. A garden on 70th Street, designed by British landscape architect Russell Page, opened in May 1977.

==== 1980s to early 2010s ====
The Frick Collection renovated the house's Boucher room in the early 1980s, and ceiling lights were installed in the Fragonard and Boucher rooms during that decade. The LPC gave the museum permission to demolish the house's original sidewalk in 1983, and the bluestone pavement was replaced with blocks of Canadian granite. As part of a renovation headed by Frick Collection director Charles Ryskamp in the 1970s, the oval room and east gallery were repainted and cleaned. When Samuel Sachs II became the Frick Collection's director in 1996, he contemplated expanding the exhibition space, adding a cafe, and relocating the entrance to the house's garden. Buttrick White & Burtis were also hired in 1996 to renovate the Frick Library's offices and main reading room. The facades of the Frick House and the library were cleaned in 1999 and 2000, respectively, and the entrance to the museum was re-lit.

Annexes to the museum were proposed in 2001, 2005, and 2008, but none of the proposals were executed. The plans were canceled because it would have required an extended closure and still would not have provided sufficient space. Restorations of the house's galleries took place through the late 2000s and early 2010s to attract visitors. These included refurbishments of the Frick House's Fragonard room around 2006, the living hall in 2008, and the east gallery in 2009. The house's entrance hall and garden court were also cleaned in 2009, and the Boucher room was then restored, reopening in 2010. The dining room was modified around 2010 as well. The Frick Collection announced plans in June 2010 to convert the loggia into an enclosed gallery for ornaments and sculptures, and the LPC approved the gallery that month. The gallery was funded by the businessman Henry H. Arnhold and designed by Davis Brody Bond; it opened in December 2011 as the first new gallery at the museum in three decades.

==== 2010s and 2020s renovation ====
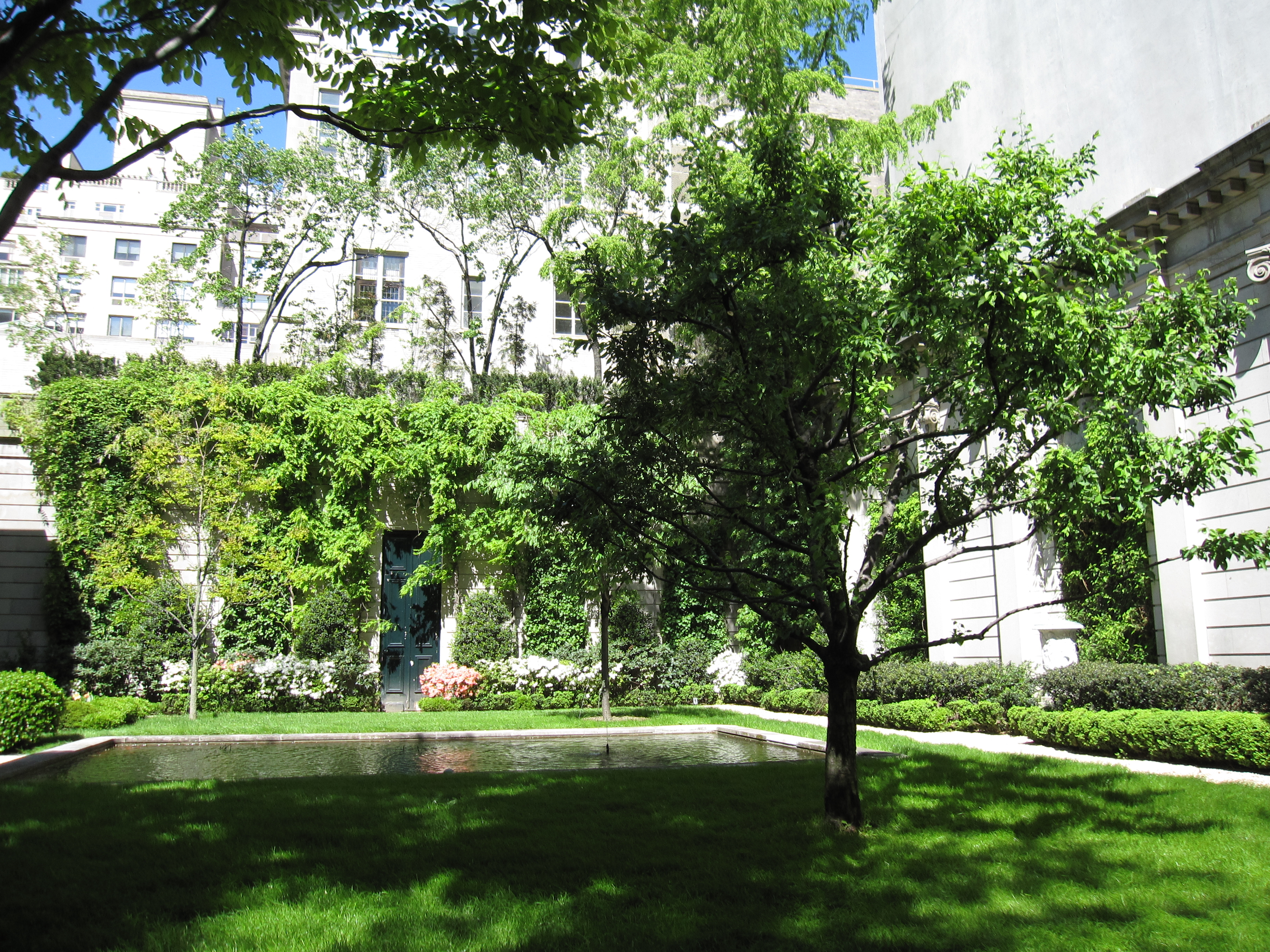
70th Street garden

In 2014, the museum announced plans for a six-story annex on 70th Street designed by Davis Brody Bond, which would contain offices and other administrative spaces. The Frick House's offices would be moved to the annex, allowing the museum to add exhibition space on the house's second floor. The 1970s addition and the 70th Street garden would have been demolished, and various rooms would have been relocated or repurposed. These plans had to be approved by the city government, since the house was a city landmark. Residents and preservationists opposed the proposed demolition of the 70th Street garden, and over two thousand opponents formed a group called United to Save the Frick. The Historic Districts Council cast an advisory vote against the annex, while artists, gallery operators, and architects wrote an open letter speaking out against the plans.

The Frick Collection announced in June 2015 that it would develop a new design for the renovation. Unite to Save the Frick put forth a competing proposal to add stories above the library and Frick House. The Frick Collection announced in early 2016 that it would hire a new architect to renovate the museum while preserving the garden. They hired Annabelle Selldorf as the architect later the same year, having contemplated proposals from 70 architects. Selldorf devised a proposal to add stories above the museum's existing buildings. The Frick Collection announced revised plans by Selldorf in April 2018, which called for expanding gallery space to 25,700 square feet (2,388 m^{2}), rebuilding Page's garden, adding a basement auditorium, and erecting back of house space above the existing structure. The plan included opening the second floor and replacing the Frick House's music room with a gallery. While preservationists preferred keeping the music room as is, Selldorf's plans were generally positively received. The LPC, which had to review any proposed modifications to the Frick House, approved the changes that June.

The house and museum closed in mid-March 2020 due to the COVID-19 pandemic, and the museum moved to the nearby 945 Madison Avenue in early 2021 to allow work on the house to begin. Artisans were hired to oversee specific aspects of the renovation, including lighting and woodwork. The museum renovated the house's mechanical systems, restored the Art Reference Library, rebuilt the garden, and added a basement auditorium and an education center. The auditorium was named for the renovation's main sponsor, Stephen A. Schwarzman, who donated $35 million to the Frick. Some existing exhibition spaces were rearranged, and a 60-seat restaurant was added to the first floor. A special-exhibition space was built in the house, since the previous special exhibition space had ceilings that were too low for paintings to be mounted permanently. During the renovation, the Frick Collection displayed a 3D rendering of the mansion's interiors on its website.

The Henry Clay Frick House reopened on April 17, 2025, followed by its restaurant, Westmoreland, that June. The new gallery space doubled the number of artworks that could be displayed in the house. The renovation is variously cited as having cost $220 million, $300 million, or $330 million.

== Impact ==
=== Reception ===
==== Early commentary ====
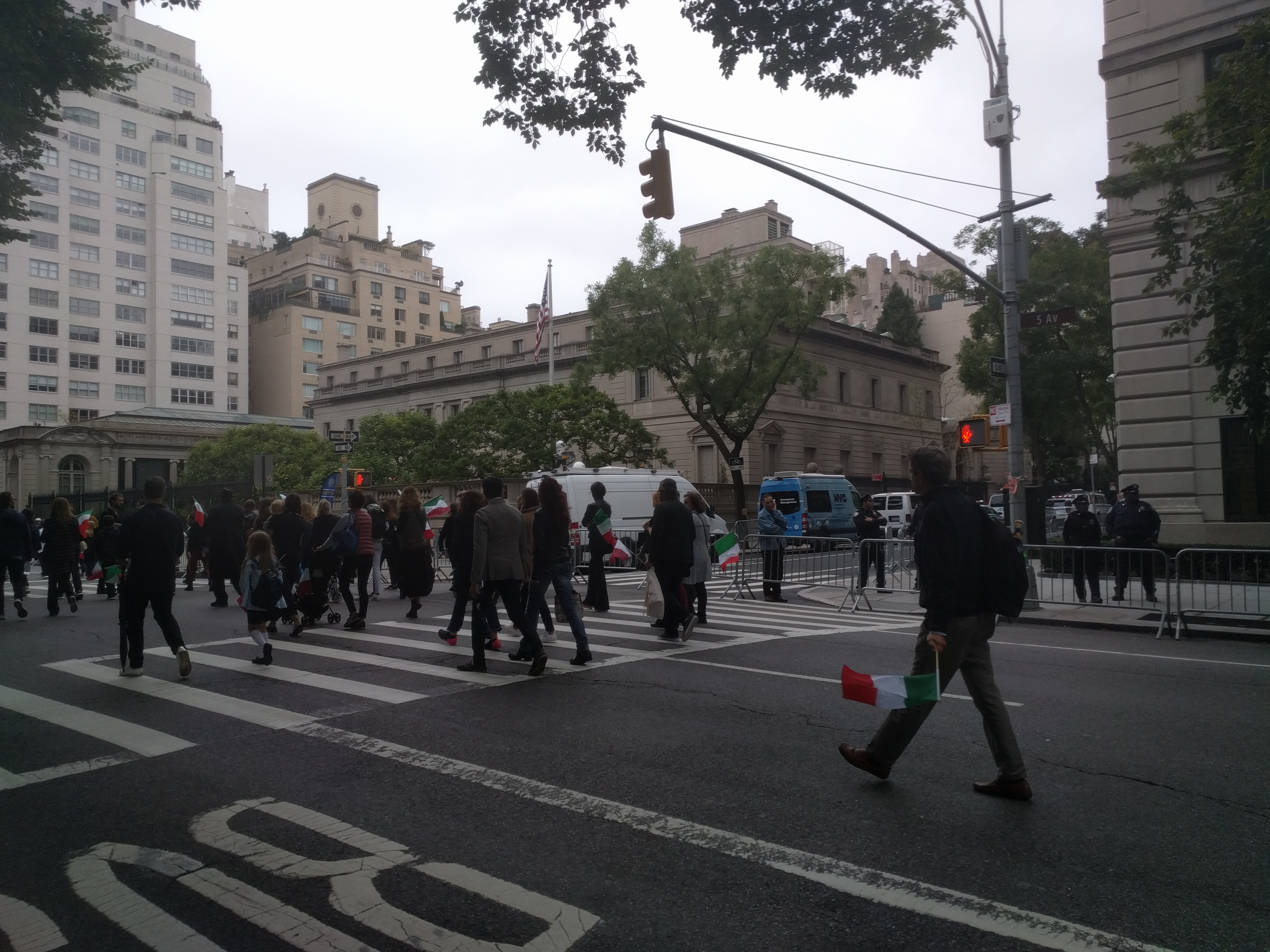
The Frick House as seen from Fifth Avenue and 70th Street during a Columbus Day parade

When the house was being constructed, a Real Estate Record writer said: "In employing Mr. Hastings as his architect, he has made an admirable selection, one which assures the erection of a beautiful and appropriate building." A reporter for The New York Times said the development of the Frick House had helped make its city block "perhaps the most interesting block devoted to private houses in the city". Another critic said that "all of the carvings on the Frick house are striking additions to the art features of the city". After the house was finished, a writer for The Spur described the mansion as "in sheer magnificence [...] surpassed by none", while another writer for the same magazine predicted that the house "will undergo no material change of character" if it was to become a museum. A writer for Art World magazine described the house as having "continued the tradition of a spot devoted to rare objects of the fine arts, if not of rare specimens of books".

The New York Times wrote in 1917 that the Frick House was only rivaled by a few other mansions on Fifth Avenue in "attracting attention", and that "inside the house [was] vista after vista of costliness and splendor". Upon Frick's death, the New-York Tribune described Adelaide's boudoir in the house as "one of the most beautiful rooms of any private dwelling". By the late 1920s, a New York Times writer described the Carnegie and Frick mansions as the "largest and most picturesque of the remaining homes" on Fifth Avenue, as many mansions on the avenue were being razed and replaced with apartments. In a retrospective of Carrère and Hastings's work, Mark Alan Hewitt, Kate Lemos, William Morrison, and Charles D. Warren wrote that "both patron and designer deserve credit for [the house's] ultimate success".

==== Commentary after museum's opening ====
When the Frick Collection opened in 1935, a writer for The New York Times praised the quality of the house's expansion. The Spur said the house was widely thought "to be the finest house in New York City", and The Washington Post similarly described it as "one of New York's most palatial homes". In the 1950s, The Christian Science Monitor called the mansion a "quiet and peaceful retreat", and Town & Country magazine dubbed it one of "the finest examples of [Fifth] Avenue's architecture that fortunately have been preserved". A writer for Cosmopolitan magazine wrote that even the 75-room Schwab House was "conservative" in comparison to the Frick House.

In 1962, a Washington Post writer said that, aside from museum security guards, "there was nothing to make the ordinary visitor feel less welcome than" its former millionaire guests. The author Merritt Folsom wrote the next year that the Frick House "is one of the few in the metropolis that will remain indefinitely as evidence of an era when millionaires did not have to share much of their wealth with the government..." Another Times critic said the library annex's reading room was "an oasis within an oasis". Conversely, in 1999, a New York Daily News reporter described the mansion as "never a home so much as it was a great vaulted hall" for Frick's art,, while Christopher Gray of The New York Times said the mansion was "straightforward in most respects, but made peculiar by the long blank limestone finger stretching out on 71st Street". A Wall Street Journal writer said in 2025 that the mansion retained "the atmosphere of intimacy that surrounds and defines one's encounter with its treasures".

There has also been commentary about subsequent annexes. Gray described the Art Reference Library building as "an elegant limestone box" in 2014. After the 70th Street annex was added in the 1970s, Paul Goldberger said the annex blended elements of both historical and modern architecture,and Newsday reporter Amei Wallach said the annex's waiting room was "more grand and more opulent than the original mansion itself". Hewitt et al. also praised the 70th Street annex as harmonizing with Hastings's original annex and Pope's expansion. When the portico gallery opened in 2011, James Gardner of The Real Deal described it as "fully in keeping with the luxurious style of the rest of the building".

Following the 2020s renovation, New York Times art critic Holland Cotter likened the mansion to a monument, while Curbed critic Justin Davidson wrote that Selldorf had successfully "transform[ed] a beloved sanctum while leaving it essentially the same". James S. Russell of Bloomberg said that the museum building was "more stylistically bifurcated", and Kate Dries of Dwell magazine, regarded the rooms as tasteful and intimate. Russell and Dries both regarded Selldorf's additions as good complements to the original building. Zachary Woolfe of The New York Times praised the Schwarzman Auditorium as "airy and bright" and compared it favorably to Lincoln Center's Alice Tully Hall, Carnegie Hall's Weill Hall, the Park Avenue Armory's Board of Officers Room, and the Morgan Library & Museum's Lehrman Hall. In 2026, a writer for the Times said the Frick House was "elegant without being fussy" and that the garden surrounding it was a rarity.

=== Landmark designations ===
The Frick House was designated as a New York City landmark in 1973, after the New York City Landmarks Preservation Commission (LPC) expressed concerns over the demolition of the adjacent Widener House. The LPC expanded its designation of the Frick House site in 1974 to include several adjacent lots. The designation applies only to the facade, as the interior rooms were never designated as landmarks. The Frick House was designated as a National Historic Landmark in 2008 under the name "Frick Collection and Frick Art Reference Library Building", marking it as a site that adds "exceptional value to the nation". The Frick House is also part of the Upper East Side Historic District, the creation of which was endorsed by the local Manhattan Community Board 8 in 1979; the district was designated by the LPC in September 1981.

=== Media and influence ===
The design of the Frick House influenced the architecture of Alder Manor in Yonkers, New York, which Hastings also designed. The Frick House was detailed in the book The Henry Clay Frick Houses: Architecture, Interiors, Landscapes in a Golden Era, by Frick's granddaughter Martha Frick Symington Sanger, as well as Colin B. Bailey's book Building the Frick Collection: An Introduction to the House and Its Collections.

According to Stan Lee, who co-created the Avengers superhero team, the Frick House was the model for the Avengers Mansion; that mansion is set at the same site as the Frick House but uses the addresses 890 Fifth Avenue. The Frick Collection did not allow any major films to be shot inside until 2012, when A Late Quartet was the first production to be granted permission to shoot inside the house. The mansion has also been depicted in the TV series America's Castles and The Undoing, as well as an episode of the documentary series Treasures of New York.

== See also ==
- List of National Historic Landmarks in New York City
- List of New York City Designated Landmarks in Manhattan from 59th to 110th Streets
- National Register of Historic Places listings in Manhattan from 59th to 110th Streets
