= Self-Portrait (Rembrandt, Altman) =

1660 painting by Rembrandt van Rijn

Self-Portrait, 1660
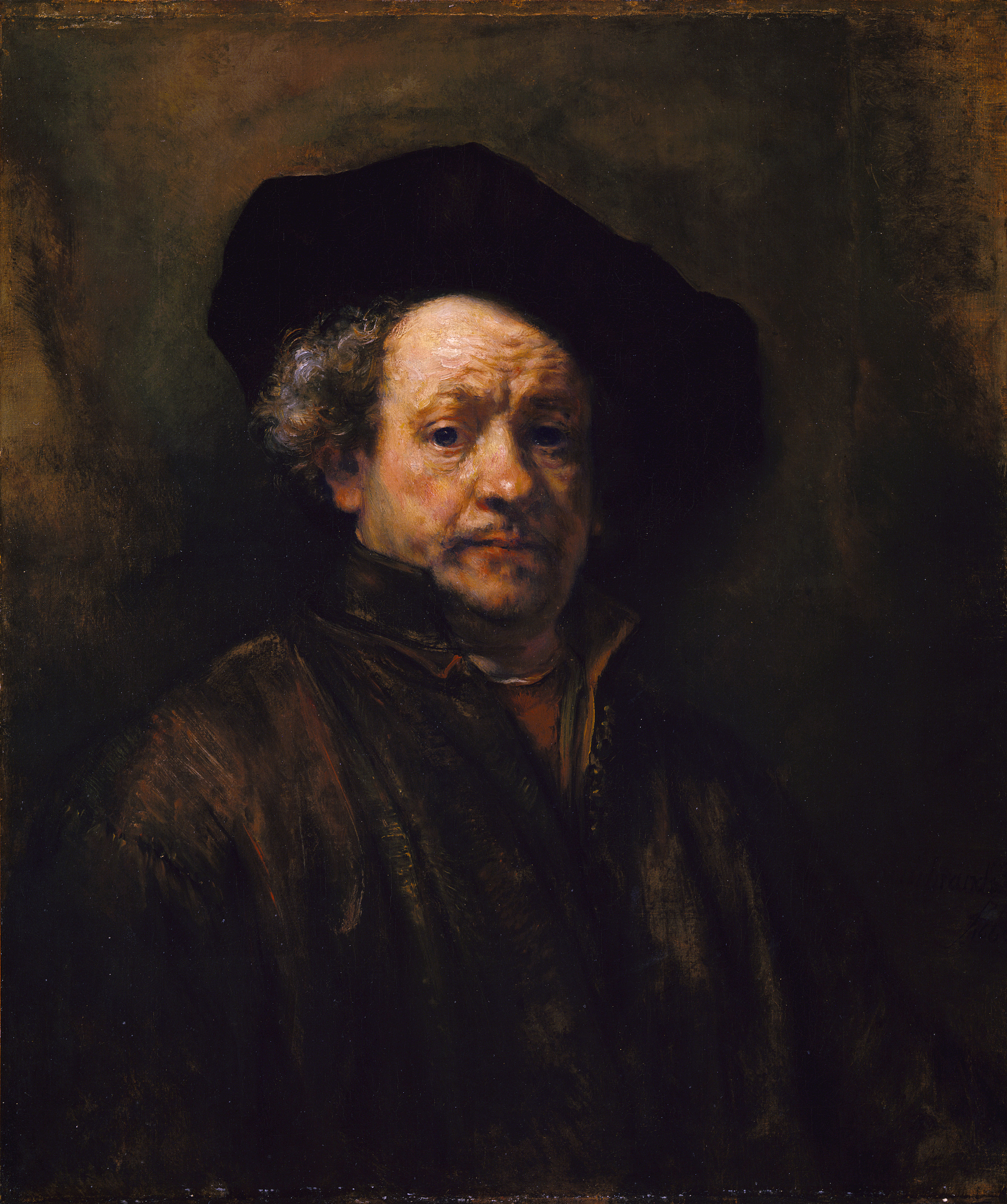
- Artist: Rembrandt
- Year: 1660
- Medium: Oil on canvas
- Dimensions: 80.3 cm × 67.3 cm (31 5/8 in × 26 1/2 in)
- Location: Metropolitan Museum of Art, New York City

Self-Portrait is a 1660 oil on canvas painting by the Dutch artist Rembrandt, one of over 40 self-portraits by Rembrandt. Painted when the artist was fifty-four, it has been noted as a work in which may be seen "the wrinkled brow and the worried expression the troubled condition of his mind". Part of the Benjamin Altman Collection, it has been in the Metropolitan Museum of Art in New York City since 1913.

== Description ==
The Altman portrait is dated 1660, when Rembrandt was fifty-four years old. He had just been declared bankrupt. His collection of art treasures was sold at auction. Meanwhile his pupils and friends distanced themselves from him. He also lost his studio space. In this portrait we have a work of mature years, when he brought all the skill and resources of a lifetime to its creation. The lift of the eyebrows that wrinkle his forehead is that of whimsical impatience, yet the spark in his eyes denies defeat. The mouth is drawn and the mark of undeserved neglect is evident in the premature wrinkles, but a certain merry pride lurks in the tilted cap and raised head. A pang of pity shoots through us, only to be replaced by one of keen satisfaction that he, the neglected, is remembered and they, the aristocrats, are forgotten. Though Rembrandt lived several years longer, they were years of misery, and he painted only one more great work, the group portrait Syndics of the Drapers' Guild, now in the Rijksmuseum in Amsterdam. His reputation suffered an almost total eclipse, although to-day he is probably the most popular painter that ever lived. As we see him in this portrait he carries his head and wears his hat jauntily, as if in defiance of the evils that engulfed him.

== Composition ==
A 1913 article said: "Technically this portrait shows Rembrandt at his best. The hat, a rich black, and the background, a warm green, are smoothly painted. The shadows in the face are thin, warm, and transparent, while the lighter parts, as on the cheek, are laid on with a well-loaded brush, suggesting the texture of the flesh and made to glow with color. Over a red waistcoat Rembrandt wears a heavy, brownish coat".

== Provenance ==
- Unknown date: Duc de Valentinois, Paris
- between 15 July 1802 and 17 July 1802: anonymous sale at Lebrun, Paris (auction house)
- by 1825: William Waldegrave, 1st Baron Radstock (1753–1825)
- 13 May 1826: purchased by Alexander Baring, 1st Baron Ashburton (1774–1848), at the sale of the collection of William Waldegrave, 1st Baron Radstock at Christie's, London
- 1848: inherited by Bingham Baring, 2nd Baron Ashburton (1799–1864), from Alexander Baring, 1st Baron Ashburton
- 1864: inherited by Francis Baring, 3rd Baron Ashburton (1800–1868), from Bingham Baring, 2nd Baron Ashburton
- 1868: inherited by Alexander Baring, 4th Baron Ashburton (1835–1889), from Francis Baring, 3rd Baron Ashburton
- 1889: inherited by Francis Baring, 5th Baron Ashburton, from Alexander Baring, 4th Baron Ashburton
- by 1908: Arthur J. Sulley & Co. (art dealers), London
- 1909/1910: obtained by Charles Sedelmeyer (art dealer), Paris
- 1909/1910: purchased by Benjamin Altman (1840–1913), New York, from Charles Sedelmeyer, Paris
- 1913: bequeathed to Metropolitan Museum of Art, New York, by Benjamin Altman, New York

== Related self-portraits by Rembrandt ==
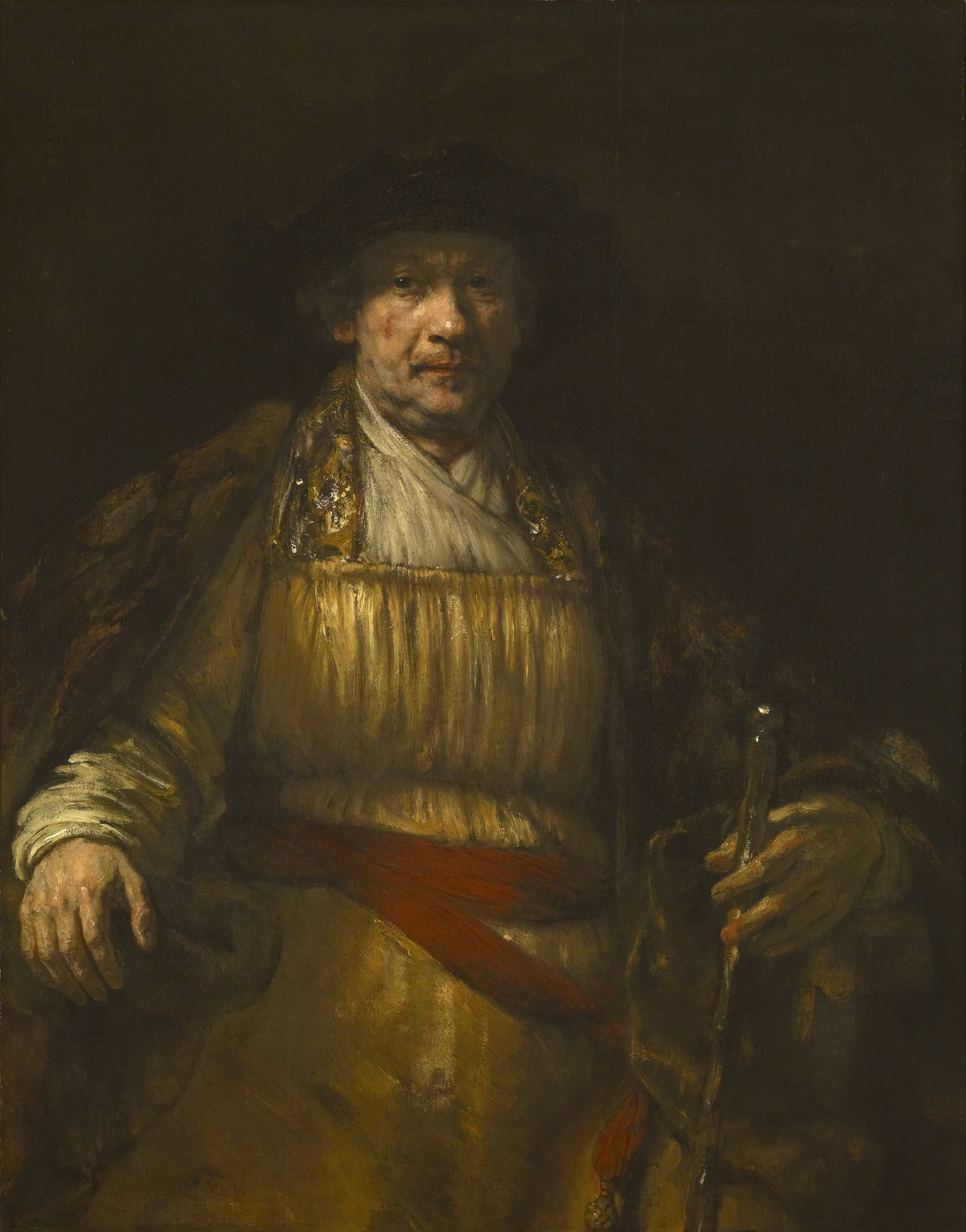
Self-portrait, 1658, Frick Collection

In 1914 a Metropolitan Museum guide said: "Those who happen to be familiar with the self-portrait of a year or so earlier, belonging to Henry C. Frick, will find a comparison of the moods of that picture and our work an interesting one. In the portrait owned by Mr. Frick, though it was also painted in a troubled time, he paints himself as though he were a philosopher or prophet to whom all things but his own thoughts are indifferent. In the Altman picture he is prematurely aged by his troubles and is pestered with worries, "the little cares and anxieties of daily life." His forehead is wrinkled and the mouth is drawn, but the cap is tilted a little jauntily on one side and the head is erect and proud."

== See also ==
- List of paintings by Rembrandt

== Notes ==
This article incorporates text from Century illustrated monthly magazine, by A.T. Van Lear, a publication from 1916, now in the public domain in the United States.
This article incorporates text from What pictures to see in America, by Lorinda Munson Bryant, a publication from 1915, now in the public domain in the United States.
This article incorporates text from Handbook of the Benjamin Altman collection, by Metropolitan Museum of Art (The Gilliss press), a publication from 1914, now in the public domain in the United States.
