= Ryskamp =

Ryskamp is a surname. Notable people with the surname include:

- Charles Ryskamp (1928–2010), American art collector and curator
- Kenneth Ryskamp (1932–2017), American judge
