= Charles Carstairs =

American art dealer

Charles Stewart Carstairs (August 1865 – July 1928) was an American art dealer. Throughout his career, Carstairs encouraged American clients to invest in European Old Master paintings. He worked closely with industrial magnate Henry Clay Frick, and was responsible for Frick's acquisition of the 'Ilchester Rembrandt' in 1906. Carstairs also worked with Joseph Widener, an American art collector and founding benefactor of National Gallery of Art in Washington, D.C.

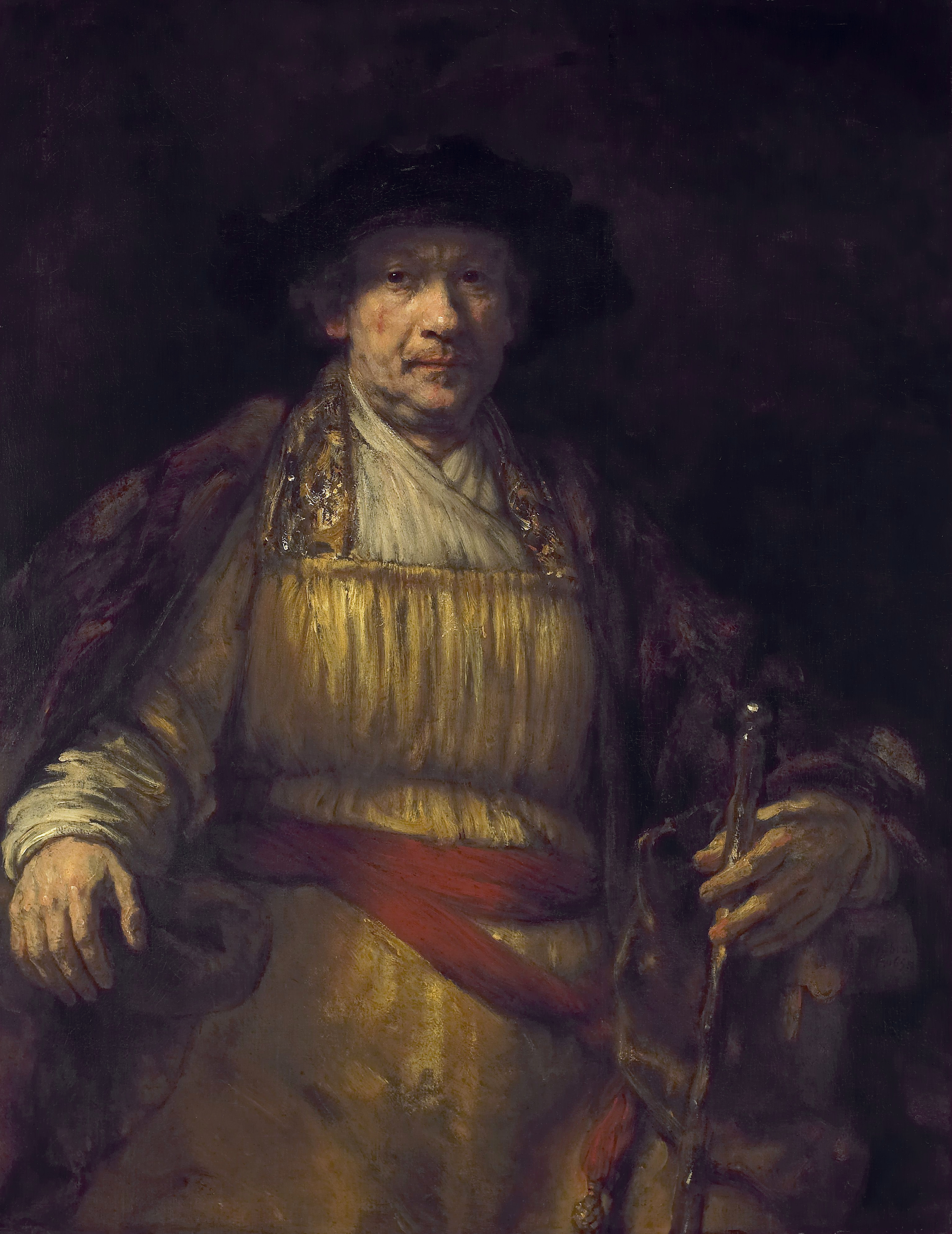
The 'Ilchester Rembrandt' in the Frick Collection

== Early life ==
Carstairs was born in Philadelphia on August 2, 1865, the 3rd son of James Carstairs and Mary White Carstairs (née Haddock).

== Career ==
In 1886, Carstairs began working for his father-in-law (Charles Field Haseltine) at Haseltine Gallery, at 1125 & 1127 Chestnut Street in Philadelphia. After working for Haseltine for eight years, Carstairs began working for Knoedler & Co. in New York City. In 1897, Carstairs was sent to Pittsburgh to lead the newly opened Knoedler & Co. branch at 432 Wood Street. Here, he began promoting Old Master paintings to Pittsburgh's industrial rich. From Pittsburgh, Carstairs moved to England in 1908 to lead Knoedler's London branch, which had opened in 1902 at 15 Old Bond Street. Carstairs reoriented the London gallery's focus from contemporary Parisian artists to Old Master paintings.

The outbreak of World War I interrupted international trade, but also lead to the movement of many Old Master Art works to the United States. This movement of art works was advantageous, both to American dealers such as Knoedler & Co. and collectors such as Henry Clay Frick. In 1915, Carstairs stated, "England acquired her great Masterpieces during the French Revolution and Napoleonic Wars and now America's opportunity has come."

In 1928, upon Roland Knoedler's retirement, Charles Carstairs, his son Carroll Carstairs, Charles Henschel (Knoedler's nephew), and Carmen Mesmore took up the management of Knoedler & Co. From this point, Charles Carstairs acted as chairman of the board at Knoedler & Co.

== Relationship with Henry Clay Frick ==
Carstairs acted as Frick's preferred dealer for some time. The large quantity of Old Master Paintings in Frick's collection demonstrates Carstairs' influence on Frick's taste. In 1908, Frick wrote in a letter to Carstairs "there is no-one whose judgment of the beautiful I have more confidence in than yours". In his relocation from Pittsburgh to New York, Frick was thrown into an increasingly competitive environment of conspicuous consumption. Carstairs turned Frick's attention to increasingly expensive Old Masters paintings as well as artworks that carried social prestige, such as aristocratic portraits, and encouraged Frick to invest in such art as a means of bolstering his reputation.

The two remained close friends over Frick's lifetime. Not only did Carstairs aid in the construction of Frick's East 70th Street mansion but he also acted as an honorary pallbearer at Frick's funeral.

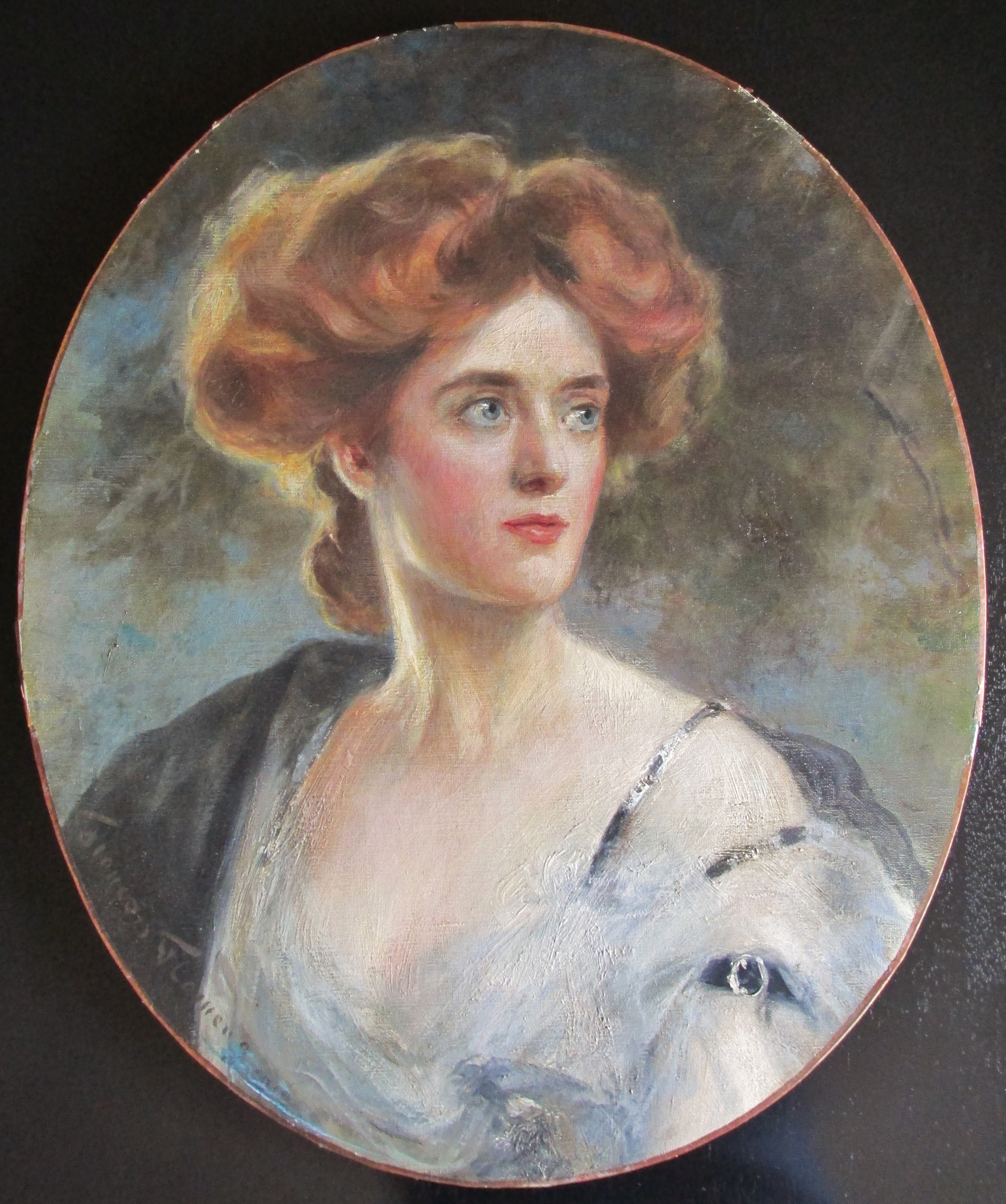
Mrs. Charles S. Carstairs, (Elizabeth Stebbins Carstairs) 1908, by Francois Flameng

== Personal life ==
In 1886, Carstairs married Esther Holmes Haseltine (29 April 1864 - 15 January 1907). Carstairs and Haseltine had four children, Charles Haseltine Carstairs (August 1886 – 26 October 1919), Carroll Chevalier Carstairs (20 March 1888 – 2 October 1948), James Stewart Carstairs (2 June 1890 – 20 September 1932) and Elizabeth “Lily” Haseltine Carstairs (2 November 1892 – April 1977).

In 1903 Carstairs met the American actress, Elizabeth Stebbins (19 October 1875 - 7 May 1949), while crossing the Atlantic, he on a buying trip for Knoedler Gallery, and she to perform on the London stage. A romance ensued, and Carstairs divorced his wife, Esther, later that year. He married Elizabeth Stebbins in 1905 and settled in the fashionable Mayfair district of London.

In 1928, shortly after being announced chairman of the board for Knoedler & Co., Charles Carstairs died of a heart attack.

== Bibliography ==
- Bailey, Colin B., Building The Frick Collection: An Introduction to the House and Its Collections, New York, NY, The Frick Collection, 2006
- Cannadine, David, Mellon: An American Life, New York, NY, Random House Inc., 2006
- Goldstein, Malcolm, Landscape with figures: a history of art dealing in the united states, Oxford, UK, Oxford University Press, 2000
- Jordan, John W., Colonial and Revolutionary Families of Pennsylvania, Genealogical and Personal Memoirs, vol. I, New York, NY, Lewis Historical Pub. Co., 1911
- McIntosh, DeCourcy E., "Demand and Supply: The Pittsburgh Art Trade and M. Knoedler & Co.",Collecting in the Gilded Age: Art Patronage in Pittsburgh, 1890-1910, Pittsburgh, PA, Frick Art and Historical Centre, 1997
- Saltzman, Cynthia. Old Masters, New World: America's Raid on Europe's Great Pictures, 1880 - World War I New York, NY.: Penguin Group (USA) Inc., 2008.
- Iacono, Margaret., "A Dealer Collects: Reconstructing Charles Stewart Carstairs's Collection," Journal of the History of Collections, Oxford University Press, April 2016.
