= Carroll Carstairs =

American art dealer

- Born: March 20, 1888
- Died: October 2, 1948 (aged 60)
- Father: Charles Carstairs

Carroll Chevalier Carstairs MC (20 March 1888 – 2 October 1948) was an American art dealer who served in the Grenadier Guards of the British Army during World War I.

He was a son of Charles Carstairs (2 August 1865 – 9 July 1928), a noted American art dealer who was chairman of the board of M. Knoedler, and his wife, the former Esther Holmes Hazeltine (29 April 1864 – 15 January 1907). He had three siblings: diplomatic attaché Charles Haseltine Carstairs (August, 1886-26 October 1919), James Stewart Carstairs (2 June 1890 – 20 September 1932), an artist; and socialite Elizabeth Haseltine "Lily" Carstairs, (a.k.a. Mrs. John Henry Towers, Mrs. Martin Brown Saportas; 2 November 1892-April, 1977).

Carstairs wrote the book A Generation Missing, his memoir of the conflict, which was published in 1930.

He married, 20 March 1924, Susan Burks Yuille (5 April 1901 – 28 June 1978). Susan Burks' sister was married to Richard Wyndham-Quin, 6th Earl of Dunraven, and Susan Burks was the aunt of Thady Wyndham-Quin, 7th Earl of Dunraven. Carroll and Burks Carstairs had no children.
