= Samuel Sachs (museum director) =

American museum professional

Samuel Sachs 2nd
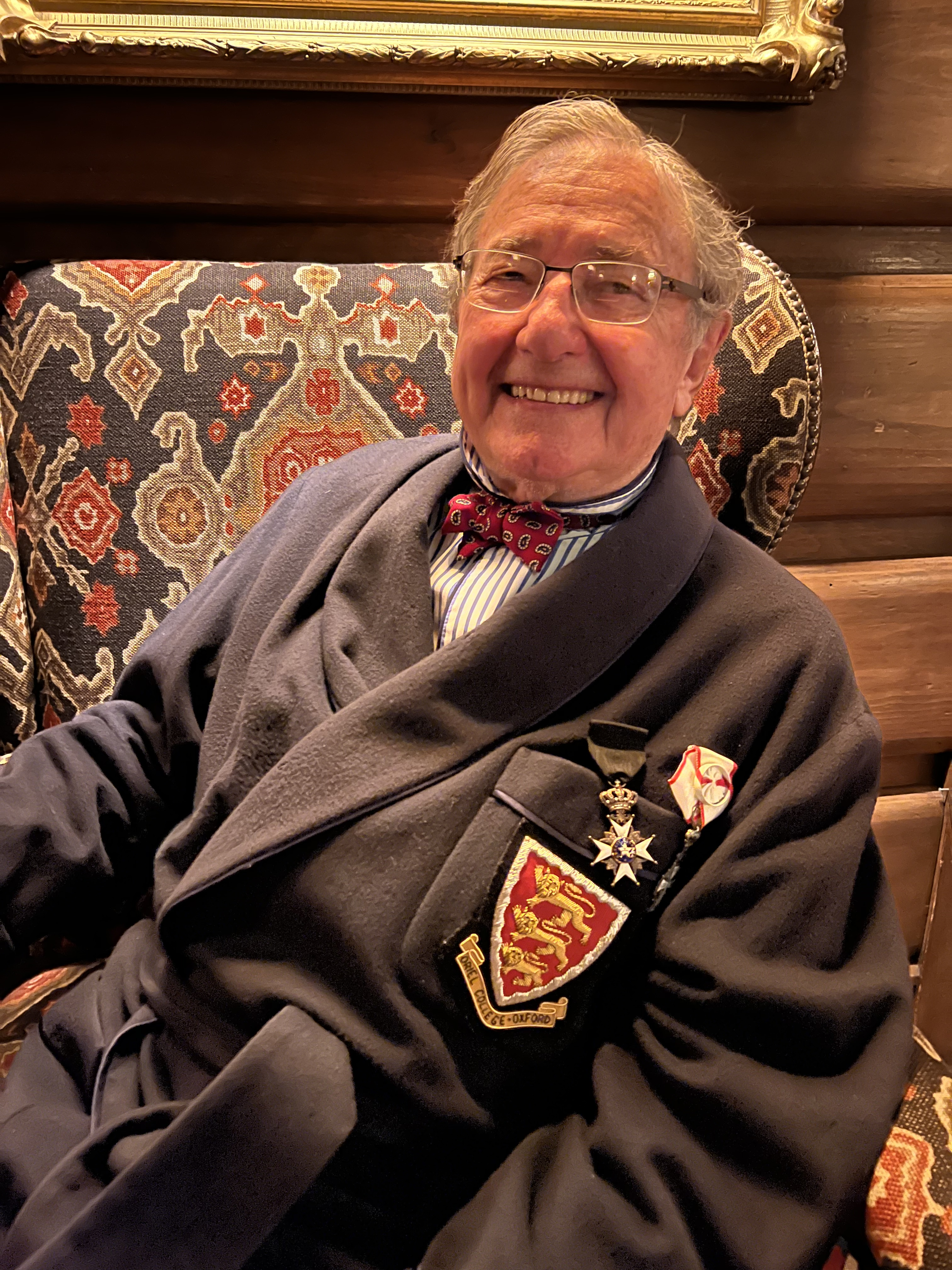
- Born: November 30, 1935 (age 90); New York City
- Education: New York University Institute Fine Arts, Harvard University
- Occupation: Museum professional

Samuel Sachs 2nd (born November 30, 1935) is an American museum professional. He has served as the director of the Frick Collection, the Detroit Institute of Arts, and the Minneapolis Institute of Art, and as the president of the Pollock-Krasner Foundation.

== Early life and education ==
Sachs was born in New York City on November 30, 1935. He graduated from Middlesex School in 1953. He received his Bachelor of Arts, cum laude, from Harvard University in 1957 and his Master of Arts degree from New York University Institute of Fine Arts in 1962.

== Career ==
Sachs became the director of the Frick Collection in 1997. Here he led the public access of the museum's collection and the Frick Art Reference Library, building renovation, talent acquisition and, digital and online development of the museum. He also organized several exhibitions, including 'Velázquez in New York Museums’, 'El Greco: Themes and Variations' and 'The Medieval Hausbook: A View of 15th-Century Life’. Sachs retired as director of Frick Collection in 2003.

In 2004, Sachs became the president of the Pollock-Krasner Foundation and is responsible for the activities of the foundation including making grants to individual artists and managing the sales and loans of the Foundation's art works.

In 2007–2008, Sachs was a Visiting Fellow at Oriel College, Oxford, UK.

Sachs was the director of the Minneapolis Institute of Art from 1973 to 1985. At MIA, he organized the notable MIA exhibition on art fakes and another on The Vikings. He was also the juror for the Minnesota State Fair Fine Arts Show. He was the assistant director of the Museum of Art and lecturer at University of Michigan in Ann Arbor from 1963 to 1964, and was the director at Detroit Institute Arts from 1985 to 1997.

== Publications ==
- Sachs II, Samuel; Fredericks, Suzanne (May 1, 2003). Marshall M. Fredericks, Sculptor. Saginaw Valley State Univ. ISBN 0972692908.
- Sachs II, Samuel; Ruskin, Judith; Peck, William (February 1, 1998). Splendors of Ancient Egypt. Abbeville Press. ISBN 0789204517.
- Sachs II, Samuel (1997). American Paintings in the Detroit Institute of Arts, Vo…. Hudson Hills Press. ISBN 1555951430.
- Sachs II, Samuel; Gardner, Direct Mary. A Private View: American Paintings from the Manoogian Collection. Arthur Schwartz Sales Co. ISBN 089467062X.
- Sach II, Samuel; Peck, William (December 31, 1997). Splendors of Ancient Egypt. Detroit Institute of Arts. ISBN 0895581485.
- Sachs II, Samuel; Hutter, Heribert. Dutch and Flemish masters: Paintings from the Vienna Academy of Fine Arts by Heribert Hutter.
- Sachs II, Samuel (1981). Favorite Paintings from the Minneapolis Institute of Art. Abbeville Press. ISBN 0896591891.
- Sachs II, Samuel (January 1, 1973). Fakes and Forgeries. The Minneapolis Institute of Arts.

== Recognition ==
Sachs is a decorated knight 1st class Order North Star (Sweden) and Order of Dannebrog (Denmark).
