= Self-Portrait (Frick, Rembrandt) =

1658 painting by Rembrandt

Self Portrait
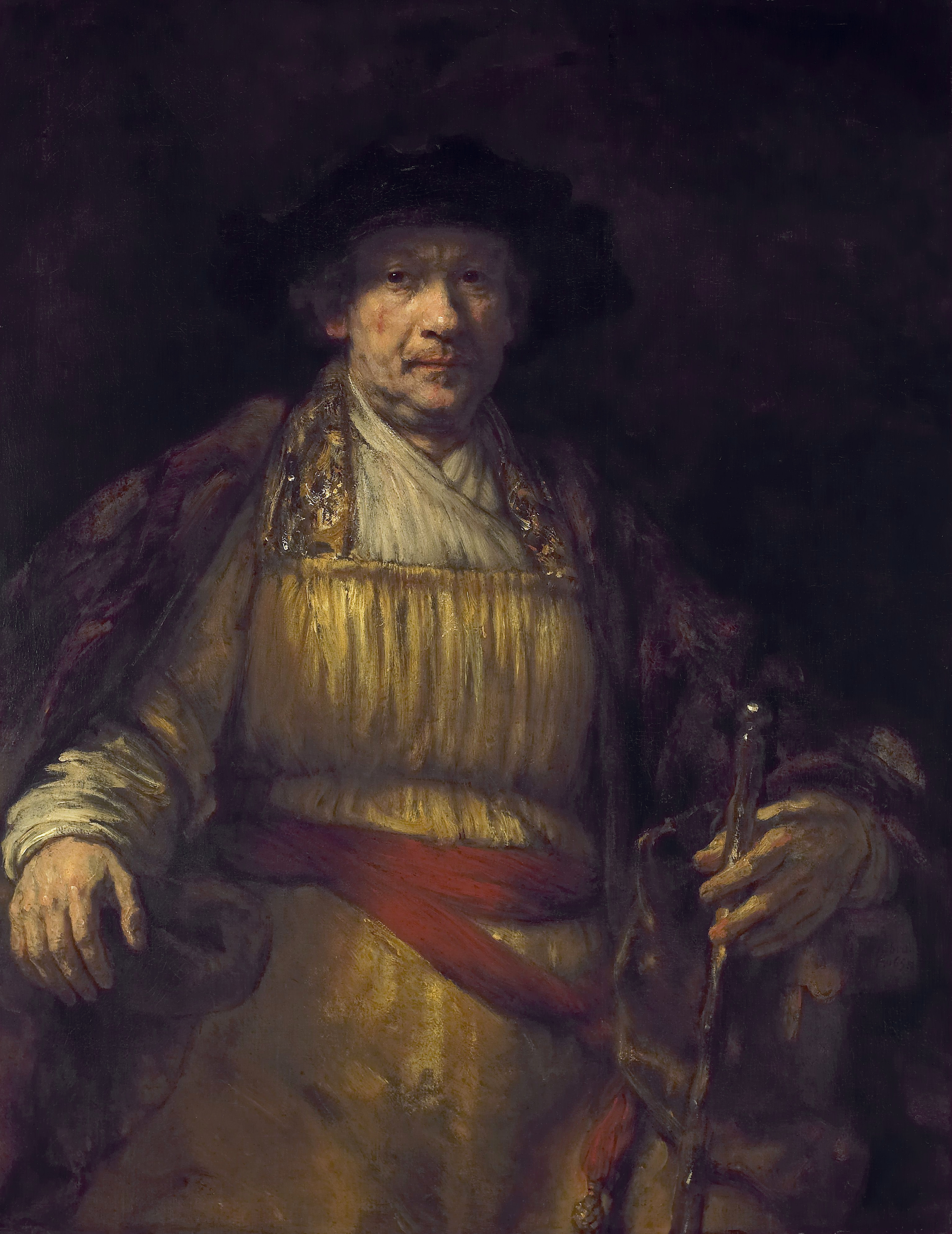
- Artist: Rembrandt
- Year: 1658
- Location: Frick Collection; New York City

The Self Portrait is a 1658 self portrait by Rembrandt, one of over 40 self-portraits by Rembrandt. It was formerly owned by the Earl of Ilchester and is now in the Frick Collection in New York City.

== See also ==
- List of paintings by Rembrandt
