= Charles Ryskamp =

American art director and curator (1928–2010)

- Born: October 21, 1928; East Grand Rapids, Michigan
- Died: March 26, 2010 (aged 81)
- Occupation(s): Art director, curator

Charles Ryskamp (October 21, 1928 – March 26, 2010) was an American art director. He headed both the Frick Collection and the Pierpont Morgan Library, was a longtime professor at Princeton University, and collected drawings and prints. He was born in East Grand Rapids, Michigan. At the time of his death the Yale Center for British Art had selections from his collection featured in the exhibition "Varieties of Romantic Experience: Drawings from the Collection of Charles Ryskamp". This exhibition, which was to be up from February 4 until April 25, 2010, included works from Ryskamp's collection by Romantic period artists such as J. M. W. Turner, William Blake, David Wilkie and Caspar David Friedrich. His collection of Danish Golden Age drawings with works by among others Christen Købke and Johan Thomas Lundbye was one of the finest in private hands.

Ryskamp was elected to the American Philosophical Society in 1995.

Charles Ryskamp died on March 26, 2010, at the age of 81. The Ryskamp collection was sold at auction by Sotheby's in New York City primarily to benefit Princeton University on January 25, 2011, during the house's Old Masters week.
