= List of people from Phoenix =

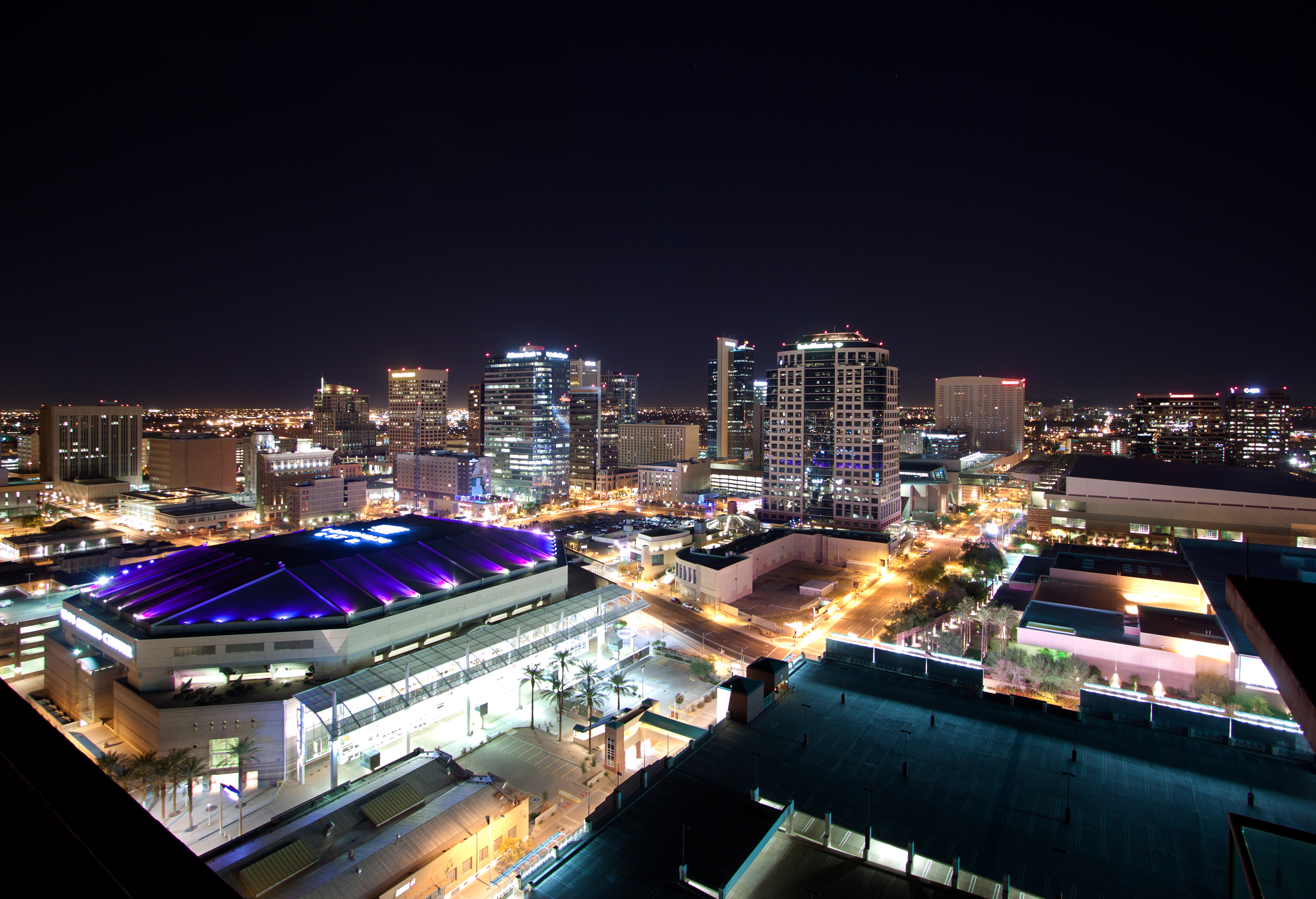
Downtown Phoenix skyline

This is a list of notable past and present residents of the U.S. city of Phoenix, Arizona, and its surrounding metropolitan area. For people whose only connection with the city is attending the nearby Arizona State University, see: List of Arizona State University alumni.

== Arts ==
- Marcus Amerman – Native American artist
- Kevin Caron – sculptor
- Spencer Herr – artist
- Thomas Kuntz – artist
- Linda Lomahaftewa – Native American artist
- Betsy Schneider – photographer
- Gage Skidmore – photographer
- Gary Tillery – artist
- Hulleah Tsinhnahjinnie – photographer
- John Henry Waddell – sculptor

== Athletics ==
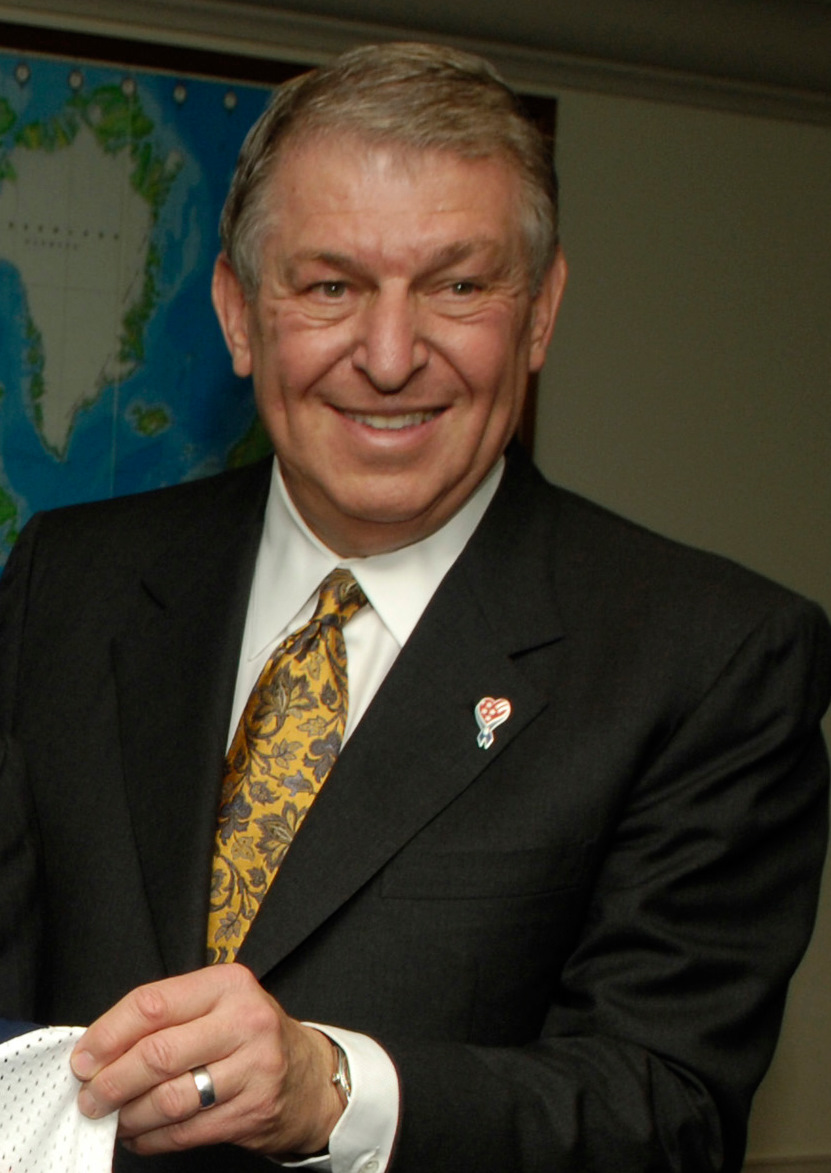
Jerry Colangelo

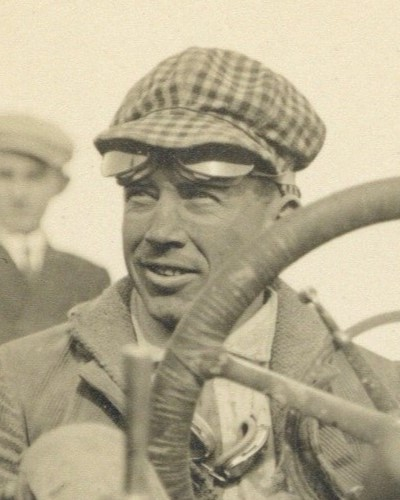
Harvey Herrick in 1911

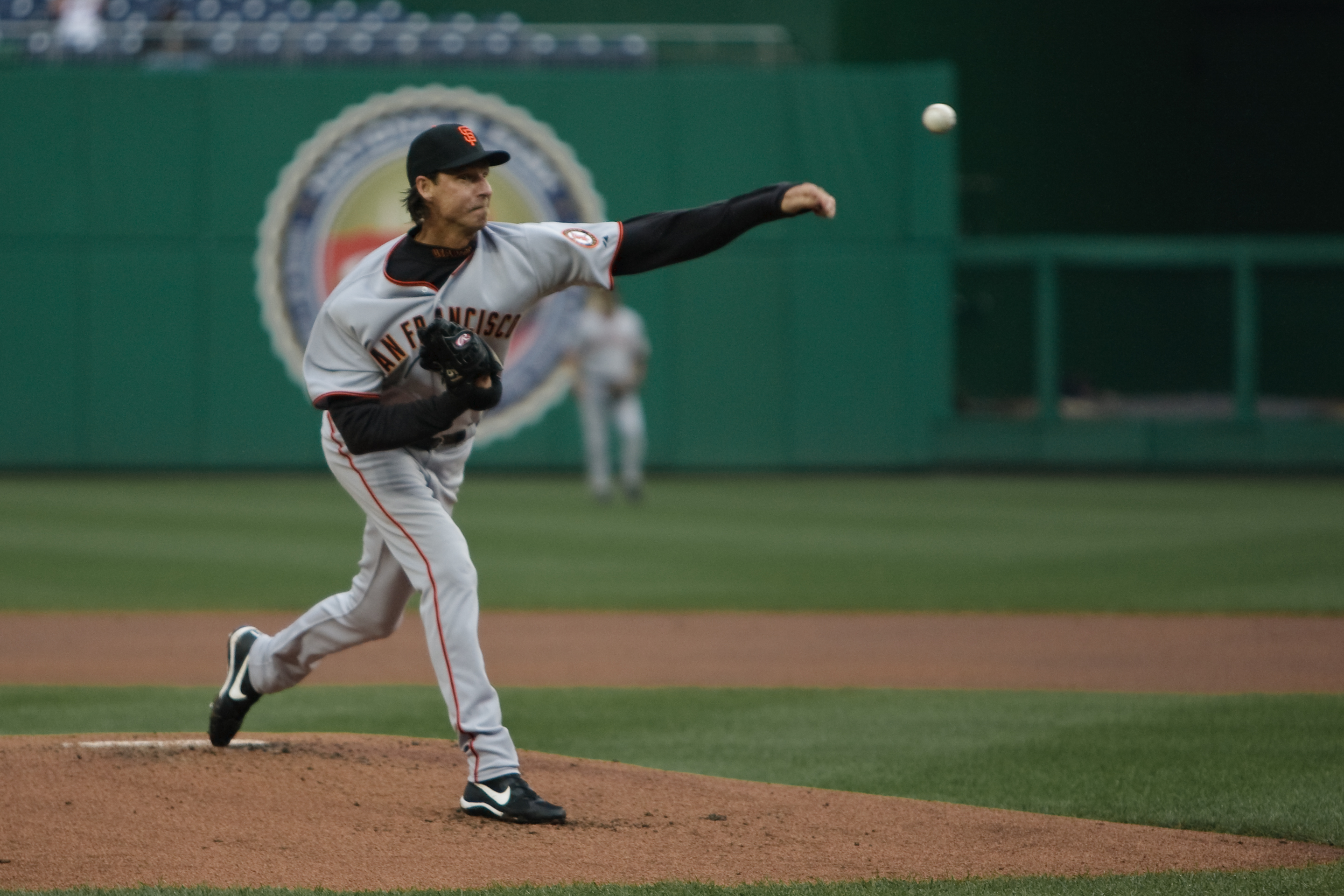
Randy Johnson joins 300 win club

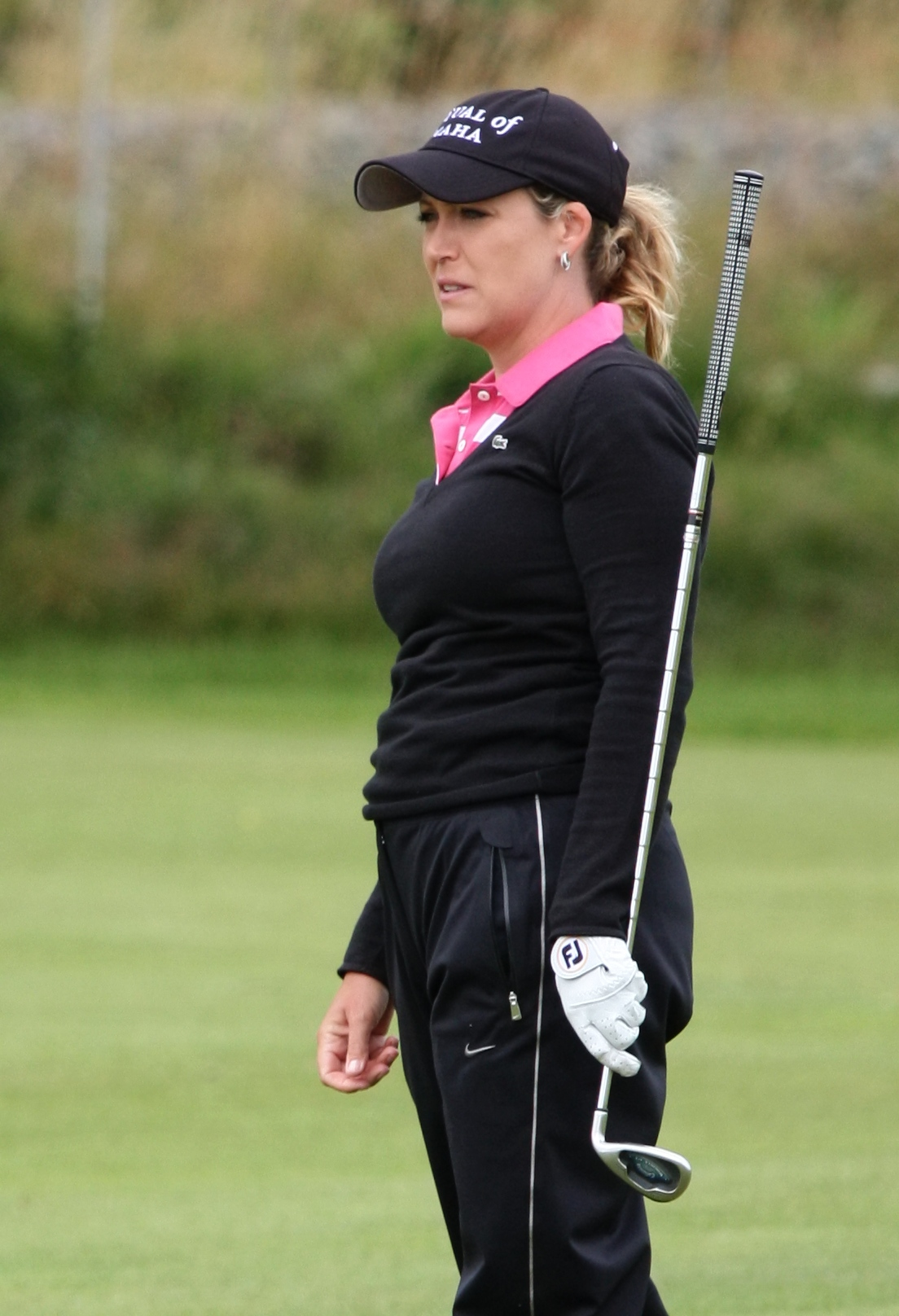
Cristie Kerr at the 2009 Women's British Open

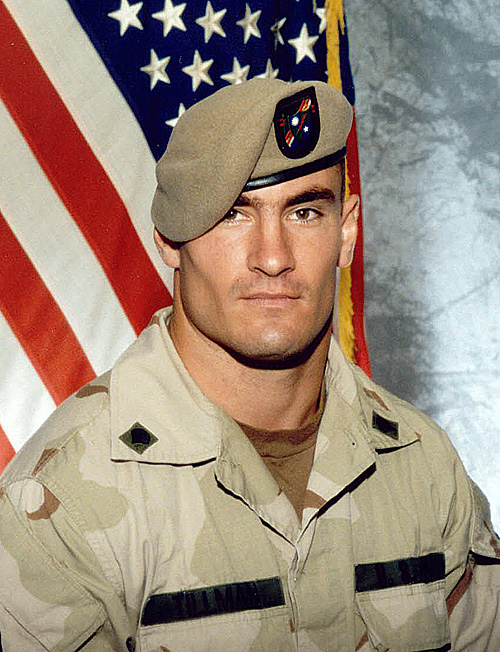
Corporal Patrick Tillman

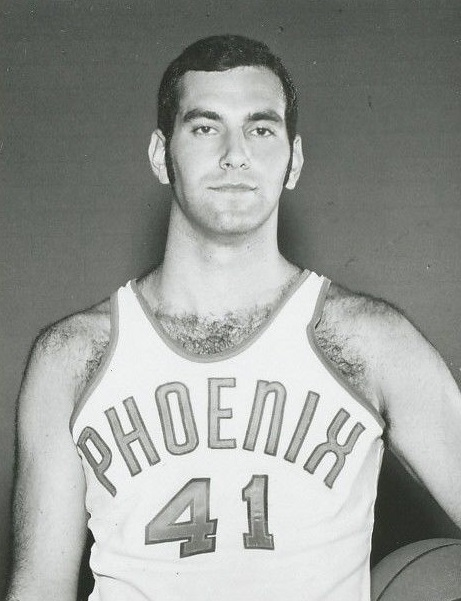
Neal Walk

- Jeremy Accardo – professional baseball pitcher
- Alvan Adams – professional basketball player
- Jeremy Affeldt – professional baseball pitcher
- Jim Ahern – professional golfer
- Mark Alarie – professional basketball player
- Ventura Alvarado – soccer player
- Charlotte Armstrong – professional baseball player
- Bobby Ball – racecar driver
- Phil Barkdoll – NASCAR owner-driver
- Charles Barkley – professional basketball player, TV commentator
- Jerryd Bayless – professional basketball player
- Rod Beck – professional baseball pitcher
- Rich Beem – professional golfer
- Mike Bell – professional football player
- Steve Belles – professional football player
- David Benavidez – professional boxer
- Mike Bibby – professional basketball player
- Amanda Blumenherst – professional golfer
- Billy Boat – professional racecar driver
- Chad Boat – professional racecar driver
- Dallas Braden – professional baseball pitcher, pitched perfect game in 2010
- Richie Brockel – professional football player
- Brian Broderick – professional baseball pitcher
- Jim Brown – professional hockey player
- Travis Brown – professional football player
- Marcus Brunson – professional sprinter
- Jimmy Bryan – professional racecar driver
- Sean Burke – professional hockey player
- Cory Burns – professional baseball pitcher
- Dan Butler – professional baseball player
- Jimmy Button – professional motocross racer
- Yori Boy Campas – world-champion boxer
- Trung Canidate – professional football player
- Michael Carbajal – professional boxer
- Jade Carey – artistic gymnast
- Fred Carr – professional football player
- Henry Cejudo – Olympic gold medalist in freestyle wrestling; MMA fighter
- Tom Chambers – professional basketball player
- Brandel Chamblee – professional golfer
- Eddie Cheever – professional racecar driver
- Matt Clapp – professional football player
- Dennis Claridge – professional football player
- Cameron Clark – professional basketball player
- Will Claye – Olympic track medalist
- Jerry Colangelo – founder of Phoenix Suns and Arizona Diamondbacks
- Steve Colter – professional basketball player
- Ty Conklin – professional hockey player
- Chris Cook – professional racecar driver
- Mike Cosgrove – professional baseball pitcher
- Sean Couturier – professional hockey player
- Jane Crafter – professional golfer
- Pauline Crawley – professional baseball player
- C. J. Cron – professional baseball player
- Kevin Cron – professional baseball player
- Mike Cunning – professional golfer
- Walter Davis – professional basketball player
- Jaff Decker – professional baseball player
- Andre Ethier – professional baseball player
- David Fatum – professional darts player and singer
- Heather Farr – professional golfer
- Jeff Feagles – professional football player
- Nick Firestone – professional racecar driver
- Cotton Fitzsimmons – former coach of the Phoenix Suns
- George Follmer – professional racecar driver
- Brandon Frazier – professional pairs skater
- Gabe Freeman – professional basketball player
- Channing Frye – professional basketball player
- Joe Garagiola – professional baseball player and sportscaster
- Scott Garlick – professional soccer player
- Gary Gentry – professional baseball player
- Todd Golden – college basketball coach
- Jesús González – world champion and Olympic boxer
- Luis Gonzalez – professional baseball player
- David Gossett – professional golfer
- Wayne Gretzky – NHL legend
- Habe Haberling – professional racecar driver
- Gary Hall Jr. – Olympic gold medalist, swimmer
- Connie Hawkins – professional basketball player
- Solly Hemus – professional baseball player
- Manny Hendrix – professional football player
- Pat Hennen – Grand Prix motorcycle racer
- Harvey Herrick – auto racing driver
- Charlie Hickcox – Olympic gold medal swimmer
- Leland Honeyman – NASCAR driver
- Jeff Hornacek – professional basketball player, coach for the Phoenix Suns
- Bob Howry – professional baseball pitcher
- Floyd Hudlow – professional football player
- Misty Hyman – Olympic gold medal winner in swimming
- Kevin Jackson – Olympic gold medalist in freestyle wrestling, MMA fighter
- Reggie Jackson – pro baseball player, Hall of Fame
- Drisan James – professional football player
- Robert James – professional football player
- J. J. Jansen – professional football player
- Richard Jefferson – professional basketball player
- Brian Johnson – professional football player
- Kevin Johnson – professional basketball player, mayor of Sacramento, California
- Randy Johnson – professional baseball player, Hall of Fame
- Steve Jordan – professional football player
- Tommy Joseph – professional baseball player
- Todd Kalis – professional football player
- Anthony Kang – professional golfer
- Mark Kastelic – professional ice hockey player
- Klete Keller – Olympic gold medal winner in swimming
- Devon Kennard – professional football player
- Cristie Kerr – professional golfer
- Scott Kingery – Major League Baseball player
- Kyle Kosier – professional football player
- Keaton Kristick – professional football player
- Lerrin LaGrow – professional baseball player
- Darren Law – professional racecar driver
- Hank Leiber – professional baseball player
- Jason P. Lester – ultra endurance athlete, author and ESPY Award winner
- Jean Claude Leuyer – professional world champion kickboxer
- Jon Levine – tennis player
- Leta Lindley – professional golfer
- Broc Little – professional hockey player
- Kevin Long – professional baseball coach
- Dan Majerle – professional basketball player
- Derek Mason – college football coach
- Doug Mathis – professional baseball player
- Bethanie Mattek-Sands – professional tennis player
- Auston Matthews – professional ice hockey player
- Billy Mayfair – professional golfer
- Damon Mays – professional football player
- Randall McDaniel – Hall of Fame football player
- Shaun McDonald – professional football player
- Phil Mickelson – professional golfer
- Scott Miller – professional football player
- Zach Miller – professional football player
- Michele Mitchell – Olympic medal winner in swimming
- Georganne Moline – Olympic track athlete
- Marty Moore – professional football player
- John Moraga – professional mixed martial artist
- Arturo Moreno – billionaire and owner of the Anaheim Angels
- Carolyn Morris – professional baseball player
- Darryl Morrison – professional football player
- Trent Murphy – outside linebacker in the National Football League; played for the Washington Redskins and Buffalo Bills
- Carl Mulleneaux – professional football player
- Lee Mulleneaux – professional football player
- Ty Murray – professional bull rider, member of Pro Rodeo Hall of Fame
- Don Nicholas – professional baseball player
- Gerry Norquist – professional golfer
- Isaiah Oliver – cornerback for the Atlanta Falcons
- Danica Patrick – Indy Racing League and NASCAR driver
- Jeff Paulk – professional football player
- Jaime Perez – Outstanding Young Man of Phoenix 2019
- Pat Perez – professional golfer
- Adam Pettyjohn – professional baseball player
- Steve Phoenix – professional baseball player
- Damon Pieri – professional football player
- Don Pooley – professional golfer
- Logan Porter – professional baseball player
- Jason Pridie – professional baseball player
- Joe Proski – professional basketball athletic trainer
- Ted Purdy – professional golfer
- Marilyn Ramenofsky – Olympic medalist in swimming
- Richey Reneberg – professional tennis player
- Buddy Rice – Indy Racing League
- Kay Rohrer – professional baseball player
- Ahmed Santos – professional boxer
- Danny Schayes – college and NBA basketball player, son of Dolph Schayes
- Curt Schilling – professional baseball player
- Kevin Scott – professional football player
- Jason Shivers – professional football player
- Travis Shumake – NHRA Top Fuel drag racer, motorsports team owner
- Sara Slattery – long-distance runner, NCAA champion
- Shelley Smith – professional football player
- Eric Sogard – professional baseball player
- Phillippi Sparks – professional football player
- Brad Steinke – Emmy award-winning sportscaster
- Jane Stoll – professional baseball player
- Nick Sundberg – professional football player
- Shawn Swayda – professional football player
- John Tait – professional football player
- Kevin Thomas – professional football player
- Marcus Thomas – professional football player
- Bernard Thompson – professional basketball player
- Tage Thompson – professional ice hockey player
- Pat Tillman – professional football player and Afghanistan War casualty
- Cole Tucker – professional baseball player
- Howard Twitty – professional golfer
- Dick Van Arsdale – professional basketball player
- Jamie Varner – professional boxer, WEC lightweight champion
- Damian Vaughn – professional football player
- Max Venable – professional baseball player
- Bobby Wade – professional football player
- Neal Walk – basketball player
- Lora Webster – Para-Olympic volleyball player
- Wayne Weiler – professional racecar driver
- Paul Westphal – professional basketball player
- Kenny Wheaton – professional football player
- Mark Whipple – professional football player, college football coach
- Danny White – professional football player
- Dot Wilkinson – Hall of Fame for bowling and softball
- Patsy Willard – Olympic medalist in diving
- Larry Willis – professional football player
- Cheyenne Woods – professional golfer (niece of Tiger Woods)
- Darren Woodson – professional football player
- Terry Wright – professional football player
- Toby Wright – professional football player
- J. J. Yeley – professional racecar driver
- Win Young – Olympic medalist in diving

== Business ==
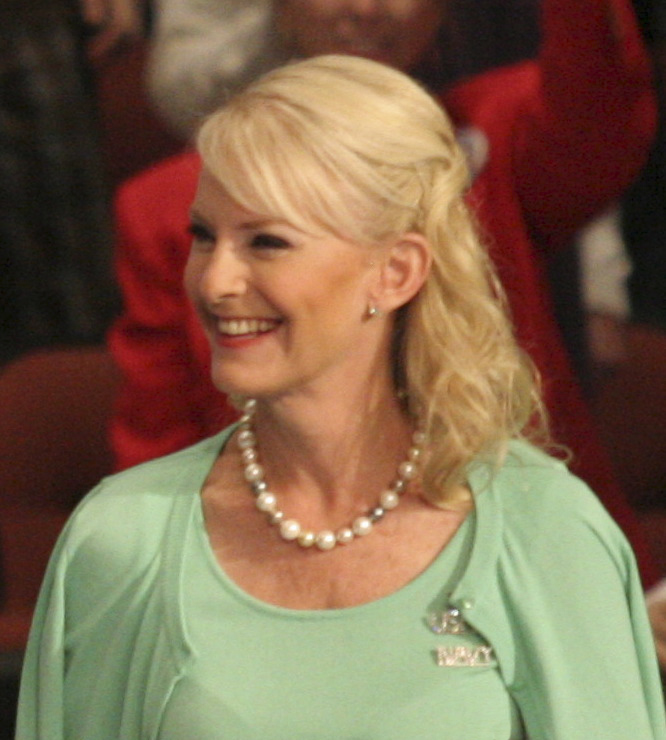
Cindy McCain in 2008

- Eddie Basha Jr. – businessman, CEO of Bashas'
- Mark Bingham – entrepreneur, passenger on United Airlines Flight 93
- Paul Elio – CEO of Elio Motors
- Dwight B. Heard – publisher, co-founder of the Heard Museum
- Jim Hensley – founder of Hensley & Co.
- Charles H. Keating Jr. – businessman
- Tom Leppert – businessman, CEO of Kaplan, Inc.
- Eddie Matney – restaurateur
- Cindy McCain – businesswoman, chairwoman of Hensley & Co.
- Bob Parsons – entrepreneur, founder of GoDaddy
- Jeffrey Peterson – entrepreneur, found of Quepasa
- Karsten Solheim – businessman, founder of Karsten Manufacturing, maker of PING golf clubs
- John Sperling – businessman, founder of University of Phoenix
- Edward A. Tovrea – entrepreneur
- Suzanne Tracht – chef
- Del Webb – real estate developer

== Literature ==
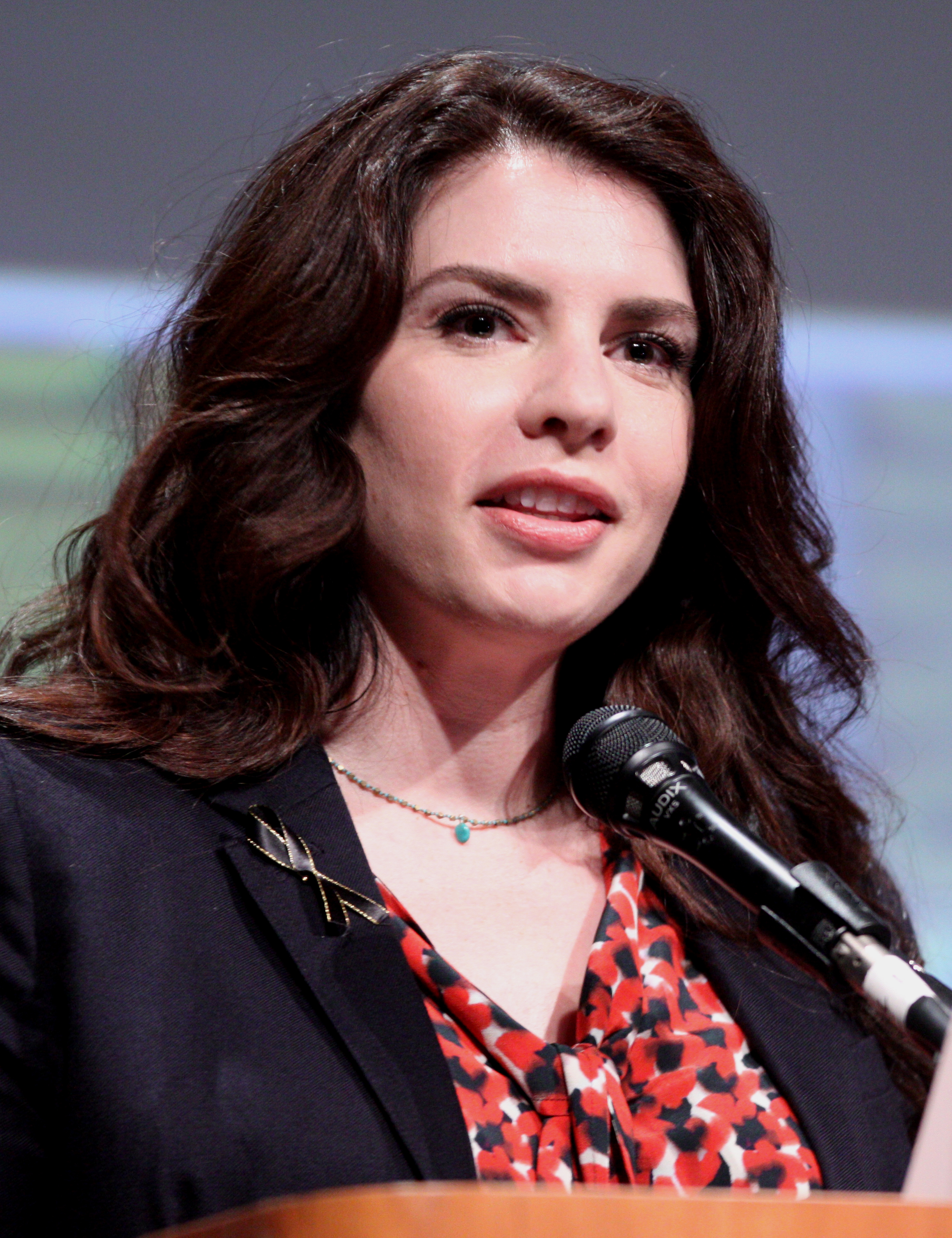
Stephenie Meyer by Gage Skidmore

- Kathleen Baldwin – author
- Sally Ball – poet
- Erma Bombeck – columnist and advice author
- Alexandra Bracken – author
- Amanda Brown – author, Legally Blonde
- Jaime Clarke – writer
- Linda Cobb – columnist, "Queen of Clean"
- Michael Collier – poet
- Clive Cussler – adventure novelist
- Boyé Lafayette De Mente – author, journalist
- Maureen Dragone – journalist, author
- Stella Pope Duarte – author
- Peter Ferrara – columnist
- Terri Fields – "Reading is Sweet" program
- Diana Gabaldon – author, creator of the Outlander series
- Shanna Hogan – journalist and author
- Flora Jessop – author, social activist
- Chalmers Johnson – author
- Bil Keane – cartoonist
- Clarence Budington Kelland – author
- Whitney Keyes – author
- Robert Kiyosaki – businessman, investor, and author; best known for the Rich Dad Poor Dad series
- Gini Koch – science fiction author
- Elisabeth Kübler-Ross – psychiatrist
- Meghan McCain – author, columnist
- Todd McFarlane – comic book author and art director
- Lisa McMann – author
- Carlton Mellick III – author
- Stephenie Meyer – teen literature novelist
- Lisa Olson – sports journalist
- Barbara Park – children's author
- Jonathan Rauch – author, journalist, and activist
- Howard Rheingold – author
- Rhondi A. Vilott Salsitz – author
- Mary Schmich – Pulitzer Prize-winning author
- Gianna Talone – author
- Marshall Terrill – author, journalist
- Gary Tillery – author
- Lew Welch – poet

== Movies, television, and media ==
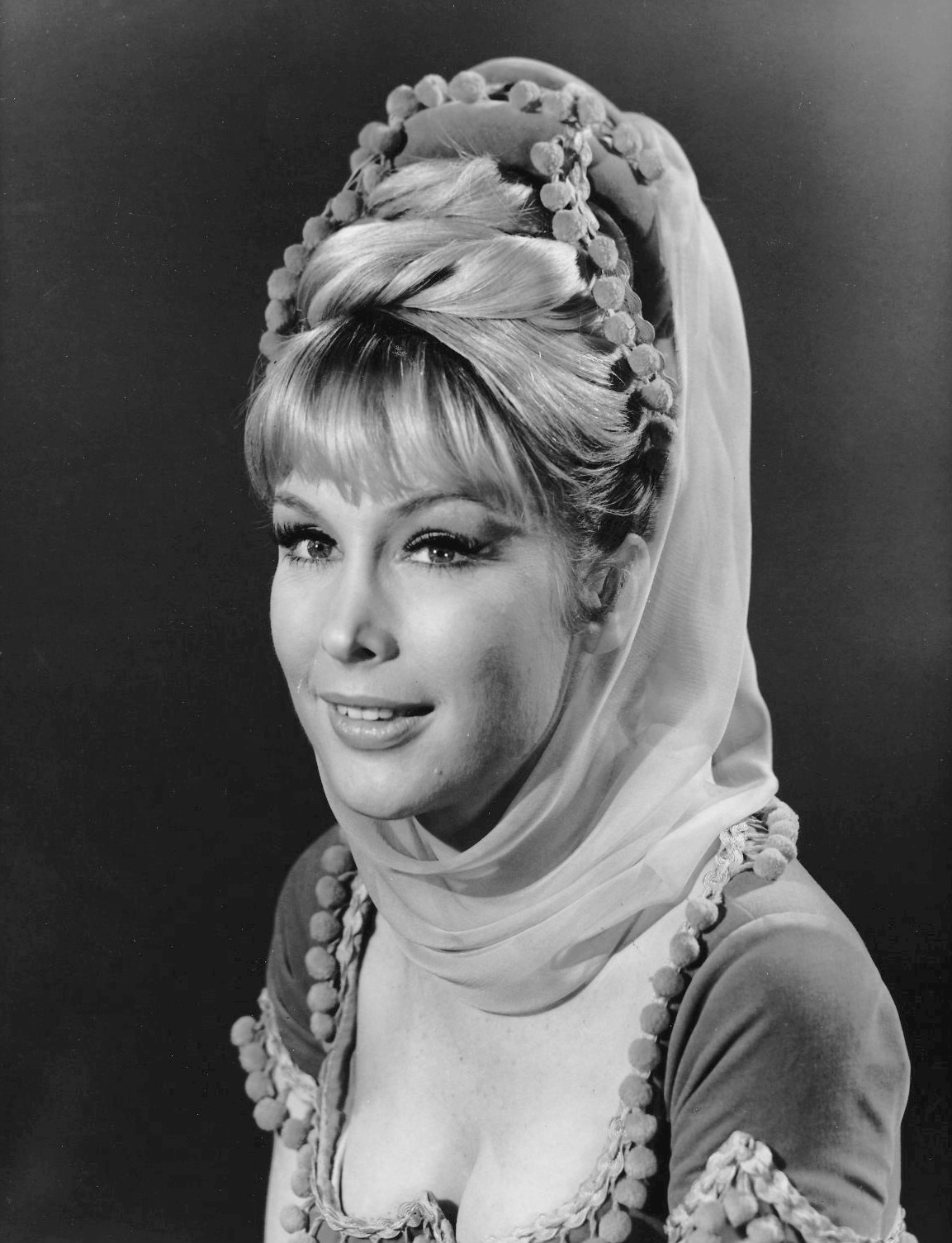
Barbara Eden as Jeannie. A variation of the famous "Jeannie costume" seen only in the pilot episode.

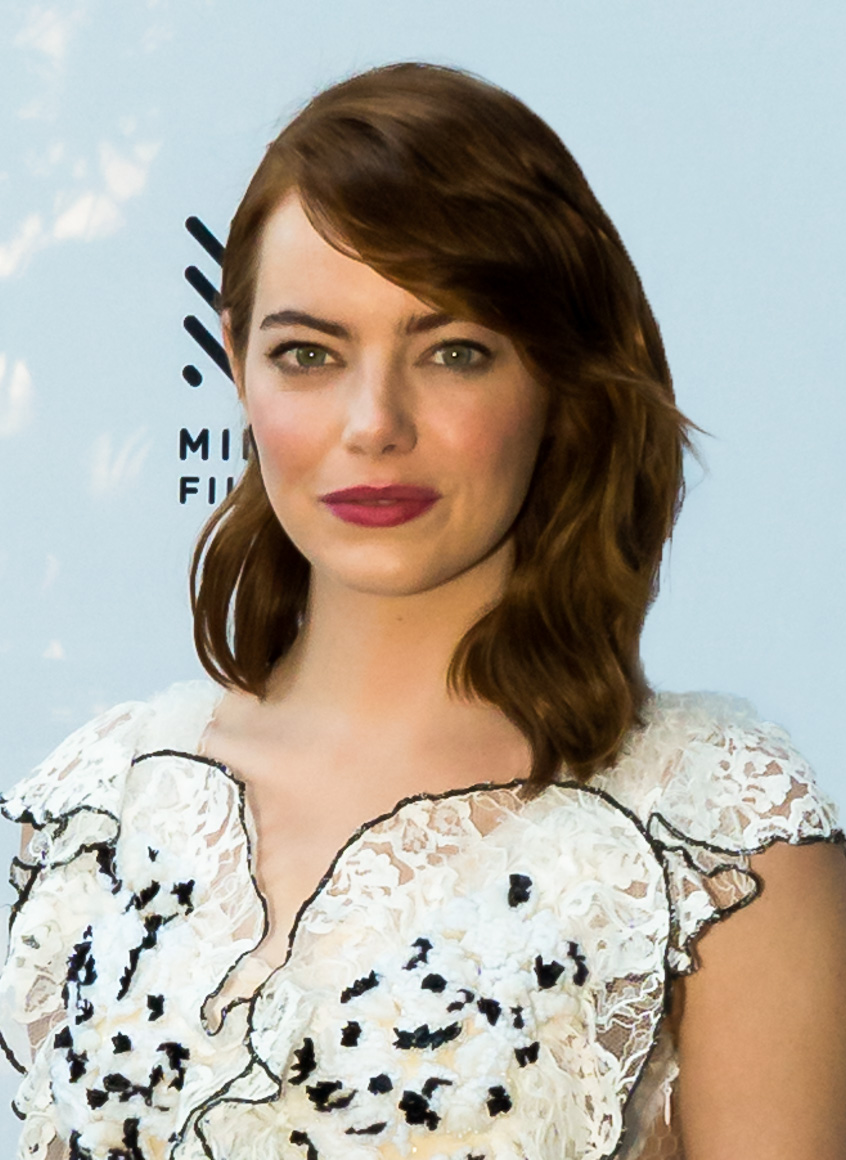
Emma Stone, 2016

- Jaime Lyn Bauer – actress
- Nellie Bellflower – actress
- The Boogeyman (Martin Wright) – professional wrestler
- Charles Boyer – actor
- Sally Brophy – actress
- Aidy Bryant – comedian, actress
- Travis Caldwell – actor
- Lynda Carter – singer and actress, title role on Wonder Woman
- Joan Ganz Cooney – producer, founder of Children's Television Workshop
- Evelyn Dall – actress, singer
- Matt Dallas – actor
- Amy Davidson – actress
- Kaitlyn Dever – actress
- Kirby Dick – film director, producer, screenwriter
- Dennis Farina – actor, Law & Order
- Maritza Lizeth Gallego Félix – television journalist
- Jennie Garth – actress
- Kimiko Glenn – actress
- Hunter Gomez – actor
- Clay Graham – TV writer, producer
- Loretta King Hadler – actress
- Sammi Hanratty – actress
- Alexa Havins – actress, All My Children
- Amelia Heinle – actress
- David Henrie – actor
- Gregg Hoffman – producer, created Saw franchise
- Daniel Humbarger – stand-up comedian
- Jenna Jameson – adult film star
- Ben Johnson – champion rodeo rider and Oscar-winning actor
- Chelsea Kane – actress
- Dianne Kay – actress
- Judy Kaye – actress, singer
- Ruth Maleczech – avant-garde actress
- Josh McDermitt – actor and comedian
- Karen McDougal – model, Playboy Playmate of the Year 1998
- Jenny Mollen – actress
- Lou Moon – stand-up comedian
- Sylvia Morales – film director, producer, screenwriter
- Frankie Muniz – actor
- Leslie Nielsen – actor, Airplane!, The Naked Gun series
- April O'Neil – porn star
- Tarah Paige – actress and gymnast
- Greg Proops – actor and comedian
- Rachel Ramras – actress, voice actress, TV writer
- Naibe Reynoso – Emmy Award-winning reporter, actress, The Practice
- Haley Lu Richardson – actress
- Ashley Roberts – actress and singer
- Jennifer Rubin – actress, model
- Jackson Robert Scott – actor
- Robert Simonds – film producer
- Johnny Somali – livestreamer
- David Spade – actor, Saturday Night Live, Tommy Boy
- Fay Spain – actress
- Steven Spielberg – Oscar-winning film director
- Emma Stone – actress
- Lizz Tayler – adult film star
- Shayne Topp – actor and internet personality on Smosh
- Amber Valletta – actress
- Dick Van Dyke – actor, The Dick Van Dyke Show, Mary Poppins
- Mare Winningham – actress
- Dean Winters – actor
- Shannon Woodward – actress
- Nick Young – actor

== Music ==
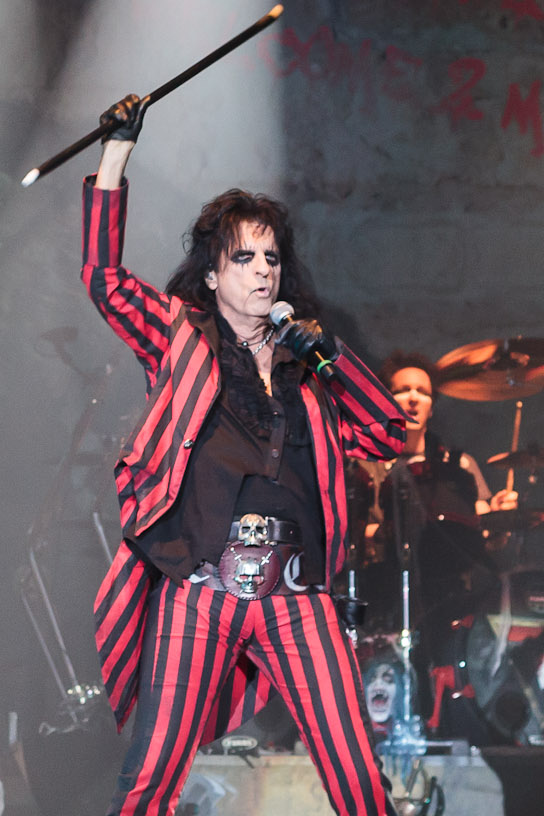
Alice Cooper performing in 2012

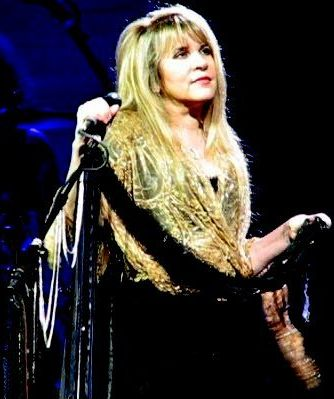
Stevie Nicks on tour in 2008

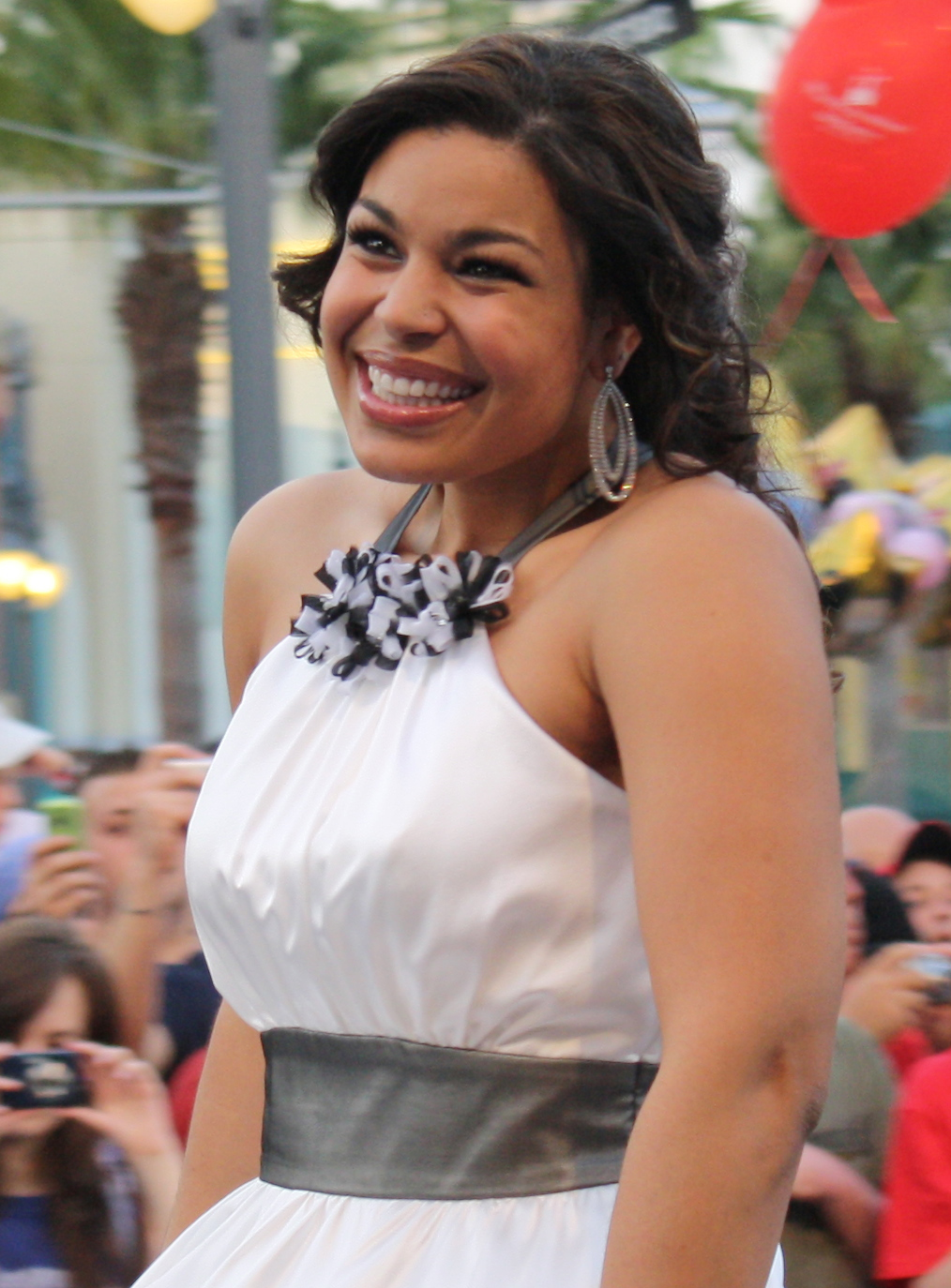
Jordin Sparks in 2009

- Michael Abels – composer
- Jim Adkins – musician, part of the band from Mesa, Jimmy Eat World
- Courtney Marie Andrews – singer/songwriter
- Geno Arce – musician/bass player
- Audrey Assad – Christian singer-songwriter
- Authority Zero – rock band
- Alec Benjamin – singer-songwriter
- Chester Bennington – musician/singer
- George Benson – musician
- Dierks Bentley – singer
- Derrick Bostrom – musician, member of Meat Puppets
- Cait Brennan – singer-songwriter
- Glen Campbell – singer
- Igor Cavalera – musician/drummer
- Max Cavalera – musician/singer
- Zyon Cavalera – musician/drummer
- Roger Clyne – singer-songwriter
- Jessi Colter – country musician
- Bruce Connole – singer-songwriter, founding member of The Jetzons
- Alice Cooper – musician
- Joey DeFrancesco – jazz musician
- Duane Eddy – singer, Rock and Roll Hall of Fame
- Dolan Ellis – musician, official balladeer of Arizona
- Esteban – guitarist
- Frank Fafara – musician
- Dom Flemons – multi-instrumentalist, singer/songwriter
- Jeff Freundlich – songwriter, music producer
- Steve Gadd – musician, drummer
- Adelina Garcia – bolero singer
- Steve George – musician, member of Mr. Mister
- Gin Blossoms – rock band
- Rob Halford – heavy metal singer
- J. Michael Harter – country musician
- Julius Hegyi – conductor, violinist
- Marcos Hernandez – singer
- Bob Hoag – musician
- Jared & The Mill – rock band
- Scott Jeffers Traveler – composer, musician
- Waylon Jennings – singer, Country Music Hall of Fame
- Zola Jesus – singer-songwriter
- Dan Johnson – musician/drummer
- William Joseph – pianist, composer
- Tim Kelleher – musician
- Brandon Kellum – musician, frontman, member of American Standards
- Bridgett Kern – gospel singer
- Kerry King – guitarist, member of Slayer
- Cris Kirkwood – musician, bassist, member of Meat Puppets
- Kongos – rock band
- Steve Larson – musician
- Nils Lofgren – musician, songwriter
- Chelsey Louise – musician, member of Fairy Bones l
- George Lynch – guitarist/songwriter, member of Dokken
- Lois Maffeo – musician
- Peter Magadini – musician
- Mali Music (Kortney Jamaal Pollard) – singer/songwriter
- MC Magic (Marco Cardenas) – rapper, producer
- Mickey McGee – musician
- Mickey McMahan – big band musician, member of the Lawrence Welk orchestra
- Bret Michaels – singer-songwriter, musician, member of Poison
- Sam Moore – singer, member of the duo Sam & Dave
- Mr. Mister – rock band
- Dave Mustaine – musician, member of Metallica and Megadeth
- Lewis Nash – jazz drummer
- Paul Nelson – composer
- Jason Newsted – bassist, member of Metallica
- Wayne Newton – singer, "Mr. Las Vegas"
- Stevie Nicks – singer
- Willy Northpole (William Adams) – rapper
- Buck Owens – country singer
- Richard Page – musician, member of Mr. Mister
- CeCe Peniston – singer
- Jerry Riopelle – musician, record producer
- Marty Robbins – singer, Country Music Hall of Fame
- Howard Roberts – jazz musician
- Bob Shane – singer, member of The Kingston Trio
- Jordin Sparks – singer
- Sydney Sprague – singer/songwriter and multi-instrumentalist
- Chris Squire – musician, songwriter, member of Yes
- Lindsey Stirling – violin, pop, electronic
- Melody Thornton – singer, Pussycat Dolls
- Tito Torbellino – musician
- The Tubes – rock band
- Upsahl – musician, singer-songwriter
- Walkin' Cane Mark – blues musician
- Brian Welch – musician, member of Korn
- Vince Welnick – musician, member of the Grateful Dead
- Z-Trip – disc jockey

== Politics ==
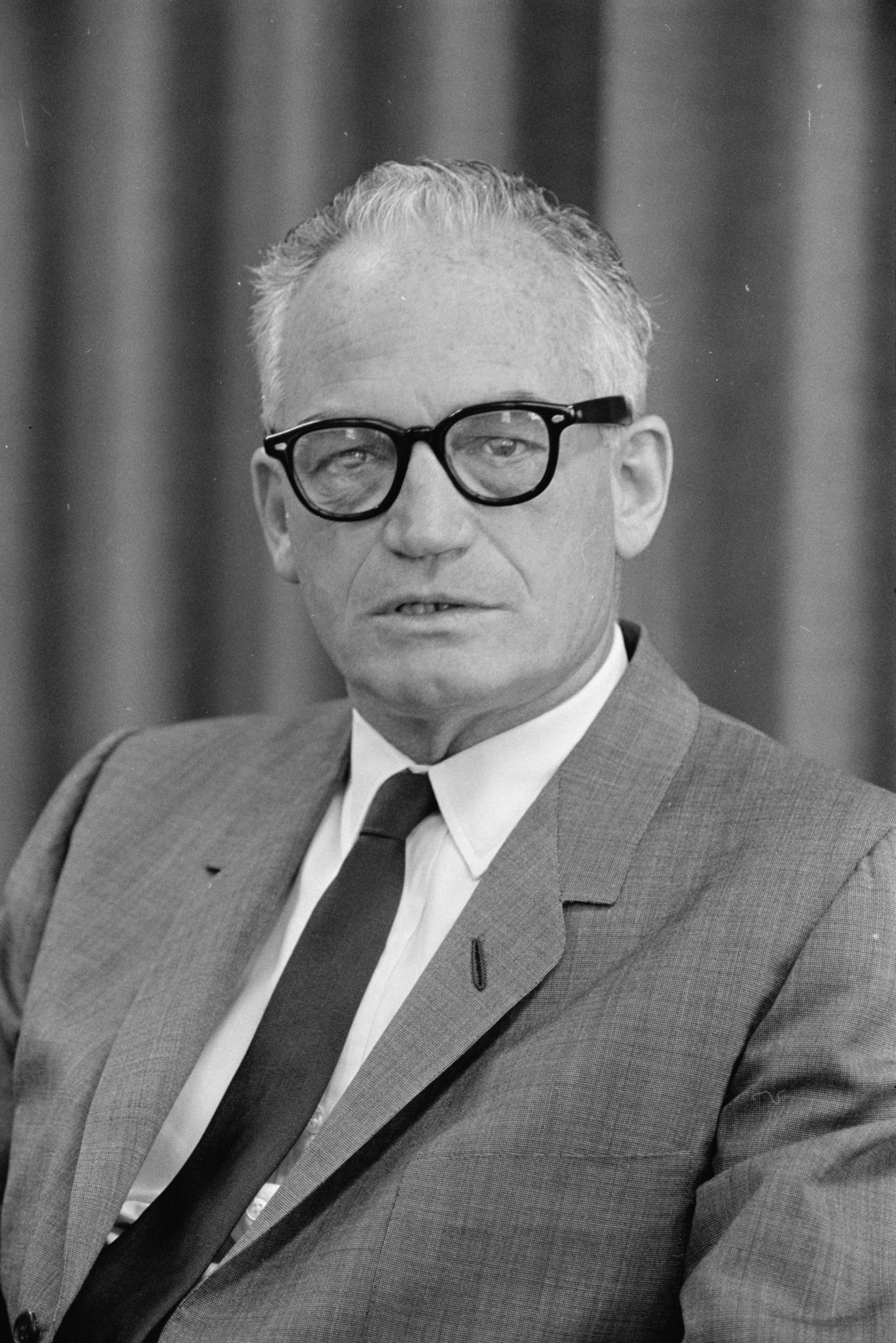
Barry Goldwater – 1962

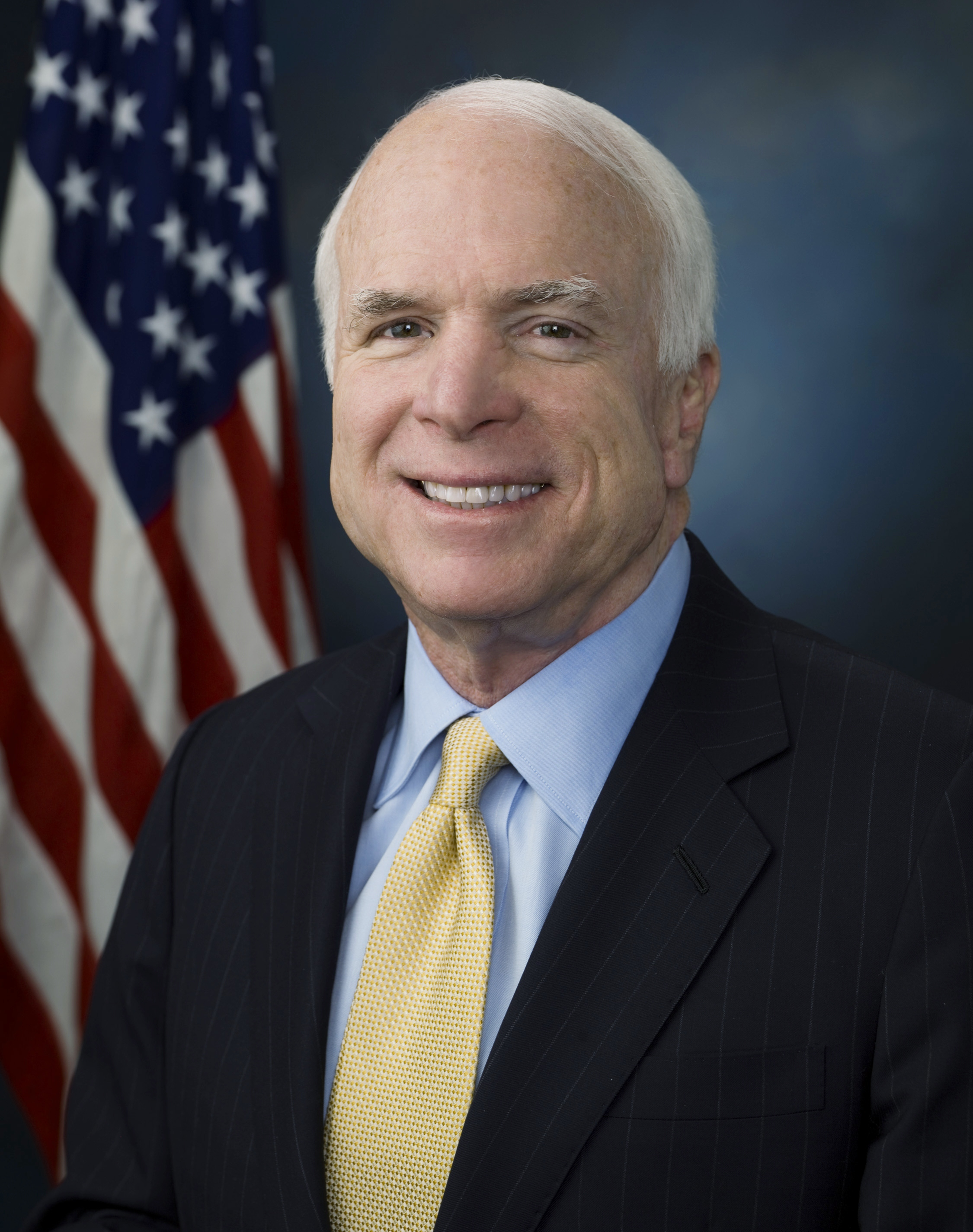
John McCain official portrait – 2009

- John T. Alsap – first mayor of Phoenix
- Lela Alston – Arizona state senator and representative
- Yassamin Ansari – U.S. representative; former Phoenix city councilor
- Joe Arpaio – former sheriff of Maricopa County
- Bruce Babbitt – former governor of Arizona and U.S. interior secretary
- Albert C. Baker – Arizona Supreme Court
- Nancy Barto – Arizona state senator and representative
- Betsey Bayless – Arizona secretary of state
- Wesley Bolin – Arizona governor and secretary of state
- Paul Boyer – Arizona state representative
- Kate Brophy McGee – Arizona state representative
- Floyd I. Clarke – former FBI director
- Hayzel Burton Daniels – state legislator and Phoenix city magistrate
- Adam Perez Diaz – Phoenix city councilman and Phoenix vice mayor
- Adam Driggs – Arizona state senator
- Kate Gallego – mayor of Phoenix since 2019
- Ruben Gallego – U.S. senator; former member of U.S. House of Representatives
- Emil Ganz – early mayor of Phoenix
- Terry Goddard – mayor of Phoenix, Arizona attorney general
- Barry Goldwater – former U.S. senator and 1964 presidential candidate
- Barry Goldwater Jr. – U.S. House of Representatives
- Phil Gordon – mayor of Phoenix
- Abraham Hamadeh – U.S. representative
- Margaret Hance – mayor of Phoenix
- Brad Hoylman – New York state senator
- Paul Johnson – mayor of Phoenix
- Denison Kitchel – Phoenix attorney and national manager of the Goldwater presidential campaign
- G. Gordon Liddy – Watergate Scandal, chief operationist
- Samuel Mardian – mayor of Phoenix
- John McCain – U.S. senator and 2000 and 2008 presidential candidate
- John McComish – Arizona state senator and representative
- Ernest McFarland – Arizona governor; senator from Arizona; chief justice, Arizona Supreme Court
- Robert Meza – Arizona state senator and representative
- Janet Napolitano – governor of Arizona and secretary of Homeland Security
- John B. Nelson – mayor of Phoenix, Arizona House of Representatives, Arizona Senate
- Sandra Day O'Connor – U.S. Supreme Court justice
- Wing F. Ong – Arizona state senator and representative
- Granville Henderson Oury – U.S. House of Representative (Arizona Territory)
- Ed Pastor – U.S. House of Representatives
- Mary Peters – U.S. secretary of transportation
- DeForest Porter – mayor of Phoenix; justice, Arizona Territory Supreme Court
- Ben Quayle – former U.S. representative
- Dan Quayle – former U.S. vice president
- William H. Rehnquist – chief justice, U.S. Supreme Court justice
- Skip Rimsza – mayor of Phoenix
- Jack Roxburgh – Canadian politician and ice hockey administrator
- Carl Seel – member Arizona House of Representatives
- John Shadegg – former U.S. representative
- Stephen Shadegg – political consultant, public relations specialist, and author
- Carl Sims – Arizona state representative
- William P. Sims – Arizona state senator
- Richard Elihu Sloan – Arizona Territory governor
- Greg Stanton – U.S. representative and mayor of Phoenix
- Bob Stump – U.S. House of Representatives
- Jesse Addison Udall – state legislator and chief justice of the Arizona Supreme Court
- John Hunt Udall – mayor of Phoenix, member of Arizona State Legislature
- Levi Stewart Udall – chief justice of Arizona Supreme Court
- Nick Udall – mayor of Phoenix
- Jack Williams – governor of Arizona, mayor of Phoenix
- Kimberly Yee – Arizona state treasurer

== Science and medicine ==
- Krystal Tsosie – geneticist and bioethicist known for promoting Indigenous data sovereignty and studying genetics within Indigenous communities

== Miscellaneous ==
- Madison Anderson – beauty pageant titleholder, crowned Miss Universe Puerto Rico 2019
- Chris Bianco – chef
- Chuggaaconroy – YouTuber
- Allison DuBois – medium (the TV show Medium is based on her life)
- Diane Downs – murderer who killed her daughter and attempted to murder her other children
- Milton Erickson – psychiatrist
- Henry Garfias – first marshal of Phoenix
- Mark Goudeau (also known as the Baseline Killer) – serial killer, responsible for 9 deaths
- William Augustus Hancock – pioneer, one of the founders of Phoenix, first sheriff of Maricopa County
- Dale Hausner and Samuel Dieteman – serial killers nicknamed the Serial Shooters who killed 8 people and wounded 19 others in a series of drug fueled drive-by shootings
- Jon Sands – federal public defender for the District of Arizona
- Jack Swilling – commonly credited with being the founder of Phoenix
- Trinidad Swilling – known as the "mother of Phoenix"; a Phoenix pioneer and the wife of Jack Swilling, the founder of Phoenix
- Philip Edward Tovrea Jr. – U.S. Army Air Forces World War II ace who was awarded the Silver Star Medal for gallantry and the Distinguished Flying Cross
- William Wasson – founder of Nuestros Pequeños Hermanos
- Frank Lloyd Wright – architect
