= Semyon Krasotkin =

Russian mathematician, journalist and Wikimedia contributor

- Семён Александрович Красоткин
- Semyon Krasotkin, 2019
- Born: July 13, 1999 (age 27); Moscow
- Education: Moscow Institute of Physics and Technology (MS)
- Occupations: mathematician, journalist
- Known for: recognising him as a political prisoner by the Memorial human rights organisation

Semyon Aleksandrovich Krasotkin (Russian: Семён Александрович Красоткин; born 13 July 1999 in Moscow, Russia) is a Russian mathematician, journalist and Wikimedia contributor. He contributes to Wikimedia projects under the username DonSimon and has served as an editor and administrator of the Russian-language Wikinews. In October 2026, he was recognised as a political prisoner by the Memorial human rights organisation after being charged with high treason in Russia.

== Biography ==
Krasotkin was born in Moscow to Aleksandr Nikolayevich Krasotkin and Marina Romanovna Krasotkina (née Gaidukova). He is the grandson of poet and educator Nadiya Krasotkina, who is from Lutsk, Ukraine.

He attended the private UNA school. He attended classes at Children's Music School No. 23 named after Alexander Scriabin and also attended a chess club.

In the summer of 2026, Krasotkin completed his master's degree at the Moscow Institute of Physics and Technology and enrolled in its postgraduate programme.

He worked as a mathematician at the V. A. Trapeznikov Institute of Control Sciences of the Russian Academy of Sciences. Over three years of work, he co-authored 15 scientific publications.

=== Wikimedia projects ===
Semyon Krasotkin at Wikiconference in Kyiv, 2016

Krasotkin began editing Wikipedia in 2009, at the age of ten. Under the username DonSimon, he made more than 67,000 edits across various Wikimedia projects. At the age of 16, Krasotkin joined the Russian-language Wikinews project, where he subsequently became one of its nine administrators. In 2021, the project published its millionth news item. His father, Aleksandr Krasotkin, was also an editor of Russian Wikinews.

=== Creative activities ===
In addition to his academic and journalistic work, Krasotkin has been involved in music. He writes and performs rap as part of a group he founded with his friends. The group has released dozens of tracks. Rapper Andrey Zamay, who knew Krasotkin through their joint livestreams, described him as a curious person with a broad interest in cultural life.

== Arrest and treason charges ==
Semyon Krasotkin was detained in mid-August 2026 at Domodedovo International Airport after returning from Kyrgyzstan. During an inspection of his phone, Russian border service officers found that he had reacted to posts in Russian opposition and Ukrainian Telegram channels. He was initially subjected to a series of consecutive administrative arrests on a minor hooliganism charge.

According to accounts cited by the media, Krasotkin was subjected to torture during this period. His captors reportedly put a bag over his head, beat him and subjected him to electric shocks.

Krasotkin was due to be released on 17 September, but instead he was transferred to the Moscow Directorate of the Federal Security Service (FSB) and charged with high treason. The investigation linked his money transfers to a Ukrainian meme channel which allegedly raised funds for the Armed Forces of Ukraine. He was also reportedly forced to record confession videos in Ukrainian.

On 19 September, the Meshchansky District Court of Moscow ordered that Krasotkin be held in pre-trial detention. On 14 October, the Moscow City Court rejected his appeal against the detention order.

On 23 October 2026, the Support for Political Prisoners. Memorial project recognised 27-year-old Semyon Krasotkin as a political prisoner. According to Memorial, Krasotkin was being held at Pre-trial Detention Centre No. 3 in Moscow, and his criminal case was being investigated under Article 275 of the Criminal Code of the Russian Federation.

On 11 November 2026, the Meshchansky District Court of Moscow granted an investigator's motion to extend Krasotkin's pre-trial detention until 17 February 2027. According to his father, the motion was presented by an FSB investigator.
