= SaveGAZ =

SaveGAZ or Save GAZ is a Russian anti-sanction movement and flashmob organized by GAZ Group workers councils that appeared in April 2019 as protest against constant postponing of lifting sanctions.

== Pre-history ==
International sanctions were presented in 2014 during the Russo-Ukrainian War which seriously deterred economic cooperation between USA and Russia and banned several personalities from entering the European Union and USA; one of them was Oleg Deripaska, the owner of GAZ Group. Despite US State Department spokespersons' statements that sanctions "were not aimed at the Russian people", workers of GAZ Group disproved it, stating that sanctions negatively affected the life of ordinary people and hindered the daily life. In 2018, GAZ workers composed and sent a letter to the US Embassy Moscow to ask for a meeting with the US Ambassador in Russia Jon Huntsman Jr. and arranging the discussion of possible sanctions lifting. According to several workers, the reason of imposing sanction was the attempt of US government to gain the control over the Russian market and give it to Ford Motor Company as the main rival of GAZ at the Russian market of commercial vehicles. However, the workers were refused to meet with US ambassador and were recommended to talk to Russian government representatives instead.

== Protests ==
In March 2019, GAZ Group asked the Government of Russia to provide sum of $468 million for the support. According to Oleg Deripaska's statements of April 2019, because of sanctions the risk of facing bankruptcy for GAZ Group has grown significantly, and the collapse would involve up 400,000 workers losing their jobs, including all the companies which are supplied by GAZ. US sanctions placed on Deripaska could cut production but almost 40% in the second half of that year. In order to make US lift sanctions from other Deripaska's enterprises as Rusal, En+ and Evrosibenergo, Deripaska decreased his share in those companies and let foreign citizens, including EU countries and USA citizens, enter the board of directors. The same actions were offered by Deripaska in order to remove GAZ Group from the sanctions field (by decreasing Deripaska's share in GAZ Group to 50%), however, Deripaska stated that United States Department of the Treasury will not accept even those conditions in exchange for lifting the sanctions against GAZ Group. Deripaska's post was published in Instagram with hashtag #SaveGAZ and contained the next text:

GAZ was once the ultimate symbol of US-Russia business cooperation. Now OFAC wants to destroy it. Along with the livelihoods of 400 thousand workers. Join the #SaveGAZ movement for your voices to be heard.

In June 2019, the workers council members (about 30 employees) held a picket in front of the US Embassy in Moscow, demanding lifting sanctions of them. The protesters shouted such slogans as Sanctions against GAZ - sanctions against me and my children, Sanctions kill cooperation, Save GAZ, save me etc. On July 1, 2019, a video clip of singing PAO Dizel (part of GAZ Group) workers, set to the track Gangsta's Paradise of Coolio, was published on YouTube channel of GAZ. The video was filmed at the GAZ factory in Yaroslavl, the lyrics were written by Ilya Bondarenko, a GAZ Group worker. However, the media attention to the clip was paid only on July 4, 2019, when another protest was arranged outside Spaso House, the US Ambassador in Russia residence, during United States Independence Day celebrations. The protesters brought banners and signs with such statements as US sanctions take bread from children’s mouths and We are collateral damage in your sanctions war. GAZ workers reminded long-standing ties between GAZ and the US, stating that Henry Ford had made great contribution to appearing of the Gorky Auto Plant, which collaborated with Americans during WWII and the next years of peace.

On August 30, 2019, Deripaska said that the future investitions of 240 billions rubles would create 30,000 workplace at GAZ Group enterprise, but the company would continue to make efforts in order to delay all economic sanctions. The current license, which prolongs terms of deals for GAZ Group and delays sanctions, ends on November 8, 2019.

== Sources ==
"Save GAZ: рабочие автозавода зачитали рэп с просьбой к США снять санкции" [Save GAZ: automobile factory workers rap and ask USA to lift sanctions] (in Russian). Wikinews Russia. 2019-07-06.
