= Shankbone =

Shankbone can have a number of different meanings, including:

- shankbone, an archaic term for the tibia
- shankbone, alternative term for zeroa, item at Passover seder

== People ==
- David Shankbone, American photographer and blogger
