= Matney =

Matney may refer to:

- Eddie Matney, American chef, restaurateur and television personality
- Marc Matney (born 1963), American voice actor
- Matney Peak, a peak in the Heritage Range of the Ellsworth Mountains, Antarctica
