= Nadiya Krasotkina =

Ukrainian poet and educator

Nadiia Krasotkina
- Надія Красоткіна
- Born: Nadiia Hryhorivna Shainiuk; August 26, 1946 (age 80); Kovel, Volyn Oblast, Ukrainian SSR, Soviet Union
- Citizenship: Ukrainian
- Education: Volyn Pedagogical Institute
- Occupations: Poet, primary school teacher
- Children: Aleksandr Krasotkin
- Relatives: Semyon Krasotkin (grandson)
- Website: https://krasotkina.com/

Nadiia Hryhorivna Krasotkina (Ukrainian: Надія Григорівна Красоткіна, née Shainiuk; born 26 August 1946) is a Ukrainian poet and educator. She was the winner of the 2004 All-Ukrainian Homeroom Teacher Competition in the category of boarding school educators. She is a co-author of the educational project Intellect of Ukraine (Ukrainian: Інтелект України).

== Biography ==
Nadiia Shainiuk was born on 26 August 1946 in Kovel, Volyn Oblast, Ukraine. In 1964, she graduated from Secondary School No. 3 in Kovel. In 1969, she graduated from the Volyn Pedagogical Institute, specialising in primary school education.

She lives in Lutsk, Volyn Oblast.

== Works ==
=== Books ===
- Live, My Language, in the Heart of the People (Ukrainian: Живи, моя мово, у серці народу). Teaching materials for primary school teachers. Lutsk, 1997.
- A School Celebration: My Native Language, Do Not Be Silent! (Ukrainian: Свято в школі «Мово рідна моя, не мовчи!»). Practical materials for teachers of secondary schools, lyceums, gymnasiums and extracurricular education institutions. Institute of Educational Content and Methods. Kyiv, 1998. 203 pp. ISBN 5-7763-8313-7.
- Learning to Write Essays: Innovative Speech Development Lessons for Grades 3 (2)–4 (3) (Ukrainian: Вчимося писати твори). A guide for primary school teachers. Kyiv: Interpress LTD, 1999. 63 pp. ISBN 966-501-029-8.
- The Warmth of My Hands, Mind and Heart I Give to My Beloved Ukraine (Ukrainian: Тепло своїх долонь і розуму, і серця я Україні милій віддаю). Kamianets-Podilskyi: Abetka, 2000. 48 pp.
- A School Celebration: My Native Language, Do Not Be Silent! (Ukrainian: Свято в школі «Мово рідна моя, не мовчи!»). Volume II. Kamianets-Podilskyi: Abetka, 2001. 316 pp. ISBN 966-7835-03-0.
- We Are Your Children, Ukraine (Ukrainian: Ми діти твої, Україно). Discussion plans for working with children, thematic fairy tales and scripts for educational events. Kyiv: Pochatkova Shkola, 2001. 159 pp., with musical notation. ISBN 966-95751-7-6.
- Educational Discussions on Road Traffic Rules and Fire Safety (Ukrainian: Виховні бесіди про правила дорожнього руху та протипожежної безпеки). Grades 1–4. Ternopil: Mandrivets, 2006. 136 pp. ISBN 978-966-634-257-0.
- Educational Discussions in Primary School (Ukrainian: Виховні бесіди у початкових класах). A guide for primary school teachers, students of pedagogical institutions and parents. Ternopil: Mandrivets, 2008. 176 pp. ISBN 978-966-634-373-7.
- Learn to Live in Friendship (Ukrainian: Учись у дружбі жити). Scripts for celebrations. Grades 1–4. Ternopil: Mandrivets, 2008. 296 pp. ISBN 978-966-634-390-4.
- Educational Activities (Ukrainian: Виховні заходи). Grades 1–4: discussions and celebration scripts. Ternopil: Mandrivets, 2008. 255 pp. ISBN 966-634-208-1.
- Educational Activities: Discussions and Celebration Scripts (Ukrainian: Виховні заходи: бесіди, сценарії свят). Grades 1–4. Ternopil: Mandrivets, 2009. 255 pp. ISBN 978-966-634-208-2.
- With Ukraine in My Heart (Ukrainian: З Україною в серці). A two-part poetry collection. Compiled by S. V. Kyrylenko and O. I. Kiyan; State Scientific Institution "Institute for Educational Modernisation", All-Ukrainian Association of the School of the Future. Chernivtsi: Bukrek, 2016. 352 pp., illustrated. ISBN 978-966-399-391-1.
- Raising Ukrainian Patriotic Citizens, Grades 1–4 (Ukrainian: Виховуємо українців-патріотів 1—4 клас). A methodological guide. Co-authored with T. Havlitina. Kharkiv: Intellectual Ukraine Publishing House, 2019. 272 pp.
- Raising Ukrainian Patriotic Citizens, Grades 5–6 (Ukrainian: Виховуємо українців-патріотів 5—6 клас). A methodological guide. Co-authored with T. Havlitina. Kharkiv: Intellectual Ukraine Publishing House, 2019. 232 pp.
- Turn to the Language with Your Heart (Ukrainian: До мови серцем прихились…). Teaching materials for Ukrainian language lessons. Kharkiv: Osnova Publishing Group, 2020. 56 pp. (Library of the journal Primary Education and Upbringing, issue 12 (204)). ISBN 978-617-00-3953-8.
- This Is Our Native Ukrainian Heritage (Ukrainian: Це наше рідне, українське). Poetry collection. Lutsk: Vezha-Druk, 2024. 216 pp. ISBN 978-966-940-559-3.
- Your Trace on Earth (Ukrainian: Твій слід на Землі). A poetry collection about people and life. Lutsk: Vezha-Druk, 2024. 296 pp. ISBN 978-966-940-594-4.
- An Eternal Theme: Parents and Children (Ukrainian: Вічна тема — батьки і діти). A poetry collection about parents and children. Lutsk: Vezha-Druk, 2024. 340 pp. ISBN 978-966-940-625-5.
- The Sun of Love and Kindness (Ukrainian: Сонце любові й доброти). A poetry collection about love, kindness and happiness. Lutsk: Vezha-Druk, 2025. 260 pp. ISBN 978-966-940-647-7.
- Ode to a Teacher (Ukrainian: Ода вчителю). A poetry collection about teachers. Lutsk: Vezha-Druk, 2025. 132 pp. ISBN 978-966-940-687-3.
- A Child in the World of Fairy Tales (Ukrainian: Дитина у світі казки). Fairy tales for primary school children. Lutsk: Vezha-Druk, 2026. 228 pp. ISBN 978-966-940-829-7.

=== Articles ===
- "The Earth – the Planet on Which I Live!" (Ukrainian: Земля — планета, на якій я живу!). A nature celebration for primary school pupils. Rozkazhit Onuku, 2006, No. 7/8, pp. 42–45.
- "My Vision of Raising Children: Reflections on the Subject" (Ukrainian: Моє бачення виховання дітей: роздуми на тему…). Pochatkova Shkola, 2019, No. 2, pp. 48–50. ISSN 0131-5358.
- "Developing Children's Observational Skills" (Ukrainian: Розвиваємо у дітей спостережливість). Pochatkova Shkola, 2018, No. 1, pp. 11–13. ISSN 0131-5358.
- "The Codes of Honour of Parents, Pupils and Teachers" (Ukrainian: Кодекс честі батьків. Кодекс честі учнів. Кодекс честі вчителя). Pochatkova Shkola, 2017, No. 10, pp. 50–52. ISSN 0131-5358.
- "A Celebration-Concert for Grandparents" (Ukrainian: Свято-концерт для бабусь і дідусів). Pochatkova Shkola, 2017, No. 7, pp. 53–55. ISSN 0131-5358.
- "Autumn Songs" (Ukrainian: Пісні осені). Doshkilne Vykhovannia, 2018, No. 9, p. 40. ISSN 0321-1401.
