= Terri Fields =

American writer and teacher

Terri Fields is a book writer and teacher from Phoenix, Arizona. Fields teaches at Sunnyslope High School, where she developed her reading program, Reading Is Sweet.

Fields encourages students to read by walking from classroom to classroom and handing out free candy to whomever she catches with one of the books recommended by her on their hands. She has said that one of her goals is to get children to "read with their brains."

Fields was selected as the 1986 Arizona teacher of the year, the first of many awards. In 2000, she was selected as one of the twenty best teachers in the United States, making the All USA Teacher Team. In 2003, she won an award of $2,000 dollars, given to 10 teachers in the 2003 Education's Unsung Heroes contest, sponsored by the ING Group. On November 5 of that year, an article about her was published by the Arizona Republic newspaper.

Fields has also written sixteen teen-oriented story books.

== Selected bibliography ==
- After the Death of Anna Gonzales (2002, Henry Holt & Co.)
- Holdup (2007, Roaring Brook Press)
- Burro's Tortillas (2007, Sylvan Dell)
- My Father's Son (2008, Roaring Brook Press)
- Missing in the Mountains (2008, Cooper Square)
- The Most Dangerous (2012, Sylvan Dell)
