= Brad Steinke =

American sportscaster

Brad Steinke is an American sportscaster based in Arizona, US. Steinke has been broadcasting professionally since 1985 and his career stops include Tucson, Arizona; Salt Lake City; Utah, Phoenix; Arizona; Miami, Florida; and Atlanta, Georgia. He has been honored with nine Emmy awards and a National Iris Award for work ranging from investigative journalism to documentaries to on-air talent. He currently is the lead anchor for Fox Sports Arizona broadcasting postgame shows for the Phoenix Suns, the Arizona Diamondbacks as well as college football and basketball.

On April 6, 2015, he joined WKRC-TV in Cincinnati, Ohio as the new weeknight sports anchor.

Early in his career he was a freelance reporter for ESPN and CNN filing several reports during his stay at KGUN-TV in Tucson.

Steinke earned a Bachelor of Arts degree in Communications and Marketing while playing four years of college basketball at Southern Utah University. He also played for the Utah Jazz entry in the inaugural Rocky Mountain Revue summer league. An avid runner, he has completed several marathons including the 1991 New York Marathon, 2005 London Marathon and the 2011 PF Chang's Rock and Roll Marathon.

Active in many charities, he is currently a board member of the Boys and Girls Clubs of Metropolitan Phoenix as well as the Phoenix 40.
