= David Shankbone =

American photographer and citizen journalist

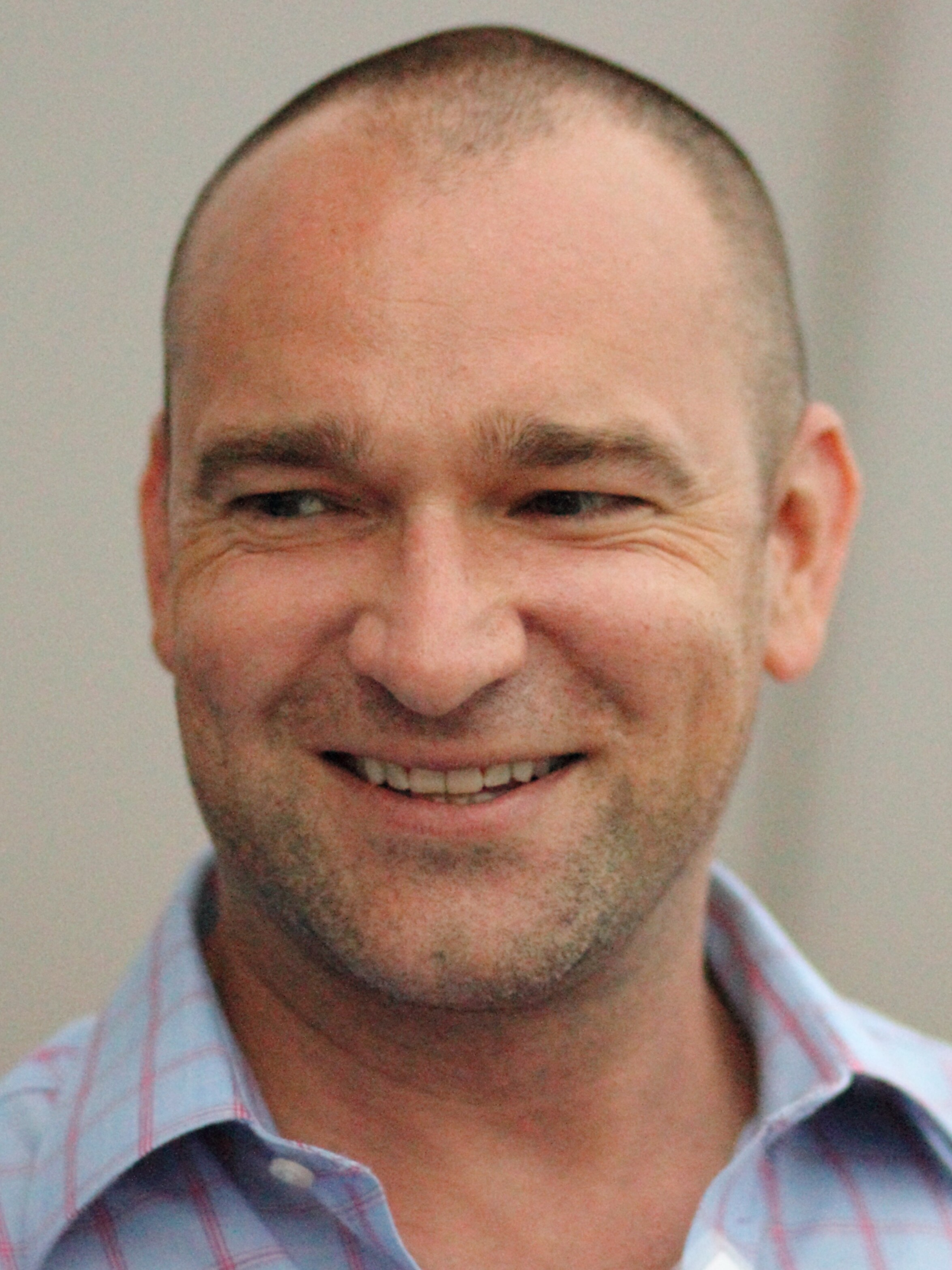
- Shankbone in 2012
- Born: David Miller
- Education: University of Colorado; Fordham University
- Occupations: Wall Street law office manager; Photojournalist
- Known for: Widespread availability of copyleft photographs on Wikipedia and elsewhere
- Website: www.davidshankbone.com

David Miller, better known by his pseudonym David Shankbone, is an American photographer, blogger, and former paralegal. He is known for his numerous copyleft photographs that were uploaded to Wikimedia Commons and seen in Wikipedia, documenting celebrities, political officials, and events, notably the Occupy Wall Street protests. As a Wikinews citizen journalist, he was the first to interview a sitting head of state, Israeli President Shimon Peres.

His photography has been featured in magazines and news websites, such as The New York Times, the Miami Herald, and Business Insider, and featured in an exhibition at the Museum of the City of New York. In a profile of his Wikinews interviews, the Columbia Journalism Review compared his work to Italian journalist Oriana Fallaci who published long transcripts of her interviews in books.

== Career ==
Before 2004, Shankbone, was a paralegal at Herrick, Feinstein, a New York law firm. Shankbone says that he began photography as a "cheap hobby" using a point-and-shoot camera given to him by his sister in response to a perceived lack of images on Wikipedia, taking advantage of the relative accessibility of prominent individuals in New York City. He says that he was mentored by the Andy Warhol collaborators Billy Name and Christopher Makos. Billy Name interviewed Shankbone for BOMB magazine about their relationship and photography. Shankbone began contributing to Wikipedia in June 2006, and in 2007 he was noted as a "leading Wikipedia editor" in Haaretz.

=== Israel ===
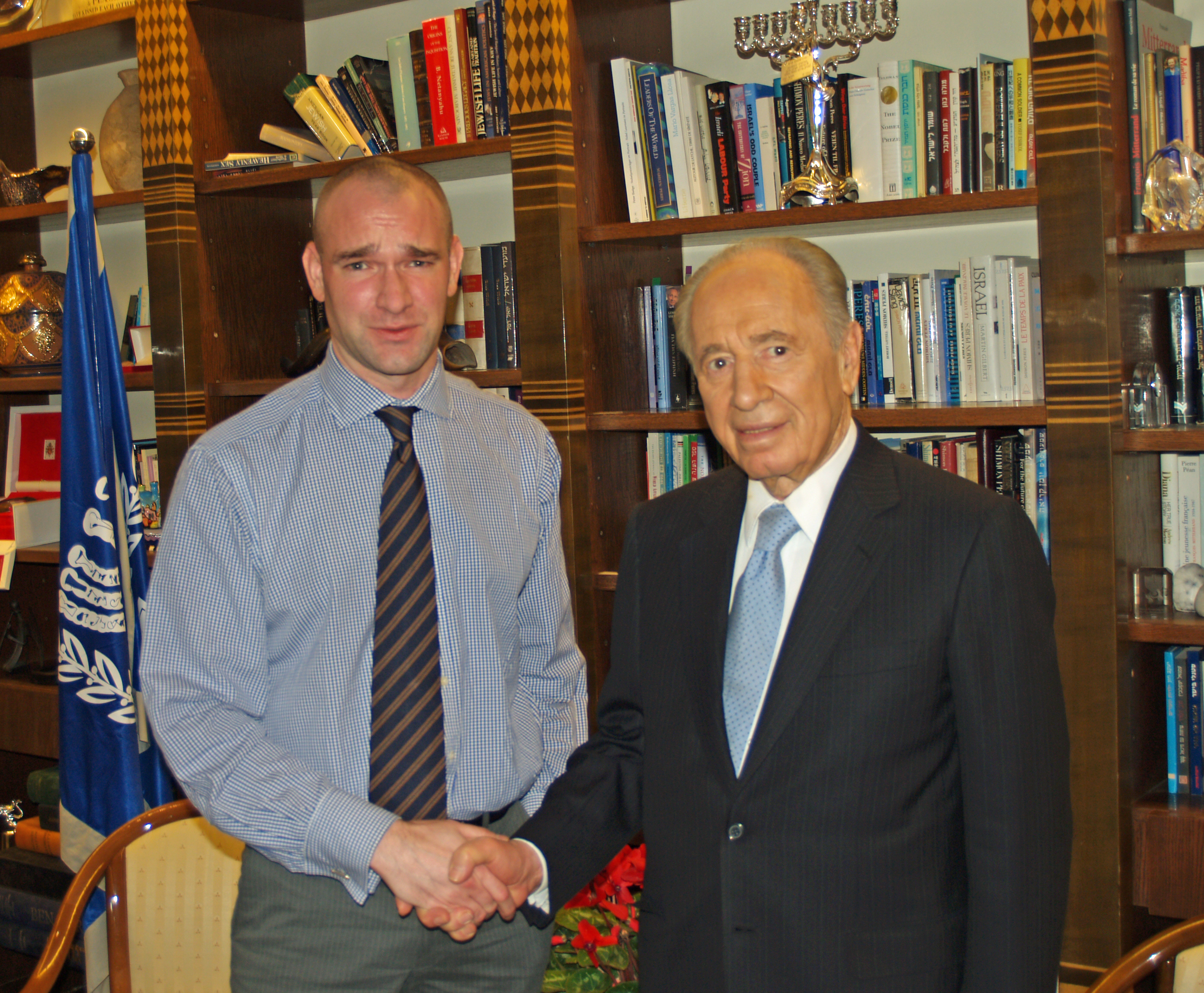
Shankbone with Israeli President Shimon Peres in 2007

In December 2007, he became the first of Wikinews's citizen journalists to interview a sitting head of state, Israeli President Shimon Peres. Miller was also profiled in the Columbia Journalism Review in January 2009, where his interviews were described as a "throwback to a time when Oriana Fallaci published long transcripts of her interviews in book form and David Frost broadcast a six-hour sit-down with Richard Nixon." Shankbone's interview was described by InformationWeek as a milestone in the development of Wikinews.

Shankbone was invited to Israel by the Foreign Ministry and the America–Israel Friendship League, as part of a delegation of technology writers, including representatives from BusinessWeek, USA Today, PC Week, and Salon, to review the Israeli technology sector. David Saranga, spokesman at the consulate in New York explained, "More than once we have faced editors connected to Israel that appear on Wikipedia in English that do not represent the reality in Israel. We decided to initiate a visit by Shankbone to describe Israeli reality as it is." While there, he requested an interview with President Peres, which to his surprise was granted; Shankbone later admitted he considered it to be one of the worst interviews he had undertaken, wishing it was more philosophical. He returned to Israel in 2009 to take photographs of the country and the Negev desert.

== Reception ==
David Shankbone talking about his history with Wikipedia

In 2011, PBS described him as "arguably the most influential new media photojournalist in the world". Colleen Asper, writing in the Brooklyn Rail, described Shankbone's photographs as "incredibly wide ranging in their scope". His photography has been featured in magazines and news websites, such as The New York Times, the Miami Herald, and Business Insider, and featured in an exhibition at the Museum of the City of New York. In a profile of his Wikinews interviews, the Columbia Journalism Review wrote, "Miller's work feels like a bit of a throwback to a time when Oriana Fallaci published long transcripts of her interviews in book form and David Frost broadcast a six-hour sit-down with Richard Nixon."

== See also ==
- Gage Skidmore
- List of Wikipedia people
- Photojournalism
