= Gage Skidmore =

American photographer (born 1993)

- Born: May 16, 1993 (age 33); Terre Haute, Indiana, U.S.
- Occupation: Photographer
- Years active: 2009–present
- Website: www.gageskidmore.com

Gage Skidmore (born May 16, 1993) is an American photographer and Creative Commons contributor. He is known for photographing American public figures, most commonly politicians and celebrities. His work has been used by publications including The Washington Post, The New Republic, The Atlantic, the Associated Press, NPR, and Wikipedia. Skidmore has been taking photographs since March 2009.

== Early life ==
Skidmore was born in Terre Haute, Indiana, on May 16, 1993. He attended high school there and later moved to Arizona, where he graduated from Glendale Community College and Arizona State University. As of 2025, he continues to reside in Phoenix.

== Photography career ==
Skidmore began taking photographs in March 2009, with his first event being the 2009 San Diego Comic-Con. Later that year, he documented the 2010 U.S. Senate campaign of Rand Paul, due to his support for Rand Paul's father Ron Paul during his 2008 bid for president. He provided the photographs publicly on his Flickr account under a Creative Commons license. During Ron Paul's 2012 presidential bid, Skidmore took a gap year to photograph Paul and several other prominent politicians campaigning for president leading up to the Iowa caucus and New Hampshire primary.

Skidmore is one of the most widely published political photographers in the United States. During the 2016 presidential election, his photographs were used by The Atlantic, The Washington Post, the Associated Press, and NPR, among others, as well as on the official website of presidential candidate Donald Trump. Skidmore has attended the annual San Diego Comic-Con where he has taken photographs of celebrities such as Sandra Bullock, Tom Cruise, Samuel L. Jackson, Angelina Jolie, and Bruce Willis.

It was estimated in 2012 that his photographs had been reposted over 1 million times. A Priceonomics study showed that as of 2016, he had posted nearly 40,000 photographs to Flickr since 2010 with his Flickr account being linked to over 30 million times. He has since posted over 130,000 photographs from political events, pop culture conventions and travel photography. Vice News described Skidmore as "one of the most prolific Creative Commons photographers out there" with photographs used by every major outlet. In addition to his Creative Commons work, Skidmore has been commissioned as a photographer by National School Choice Week, Western Journalism, the Conservative Review, and Reason magazine.

== Selected works ==
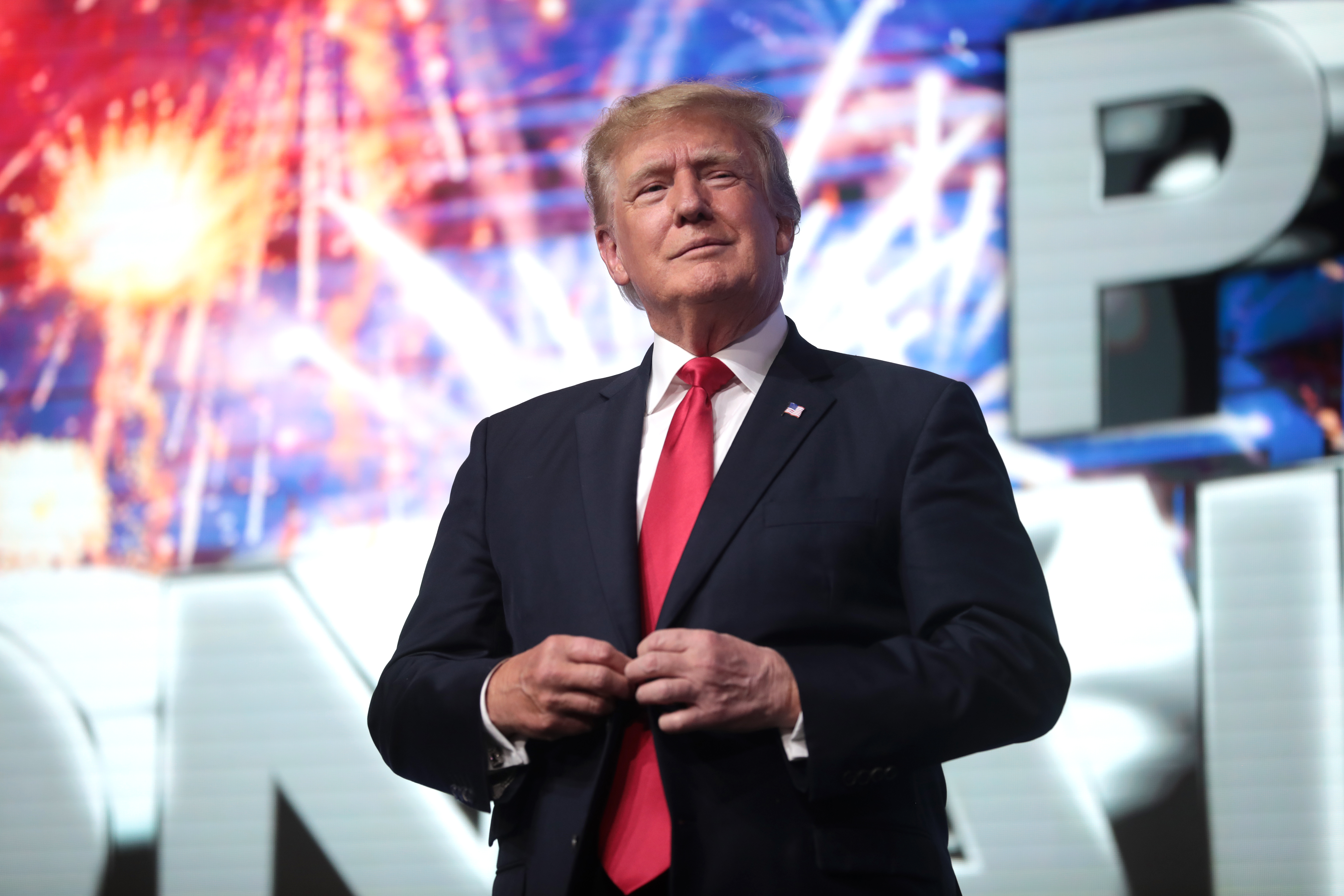

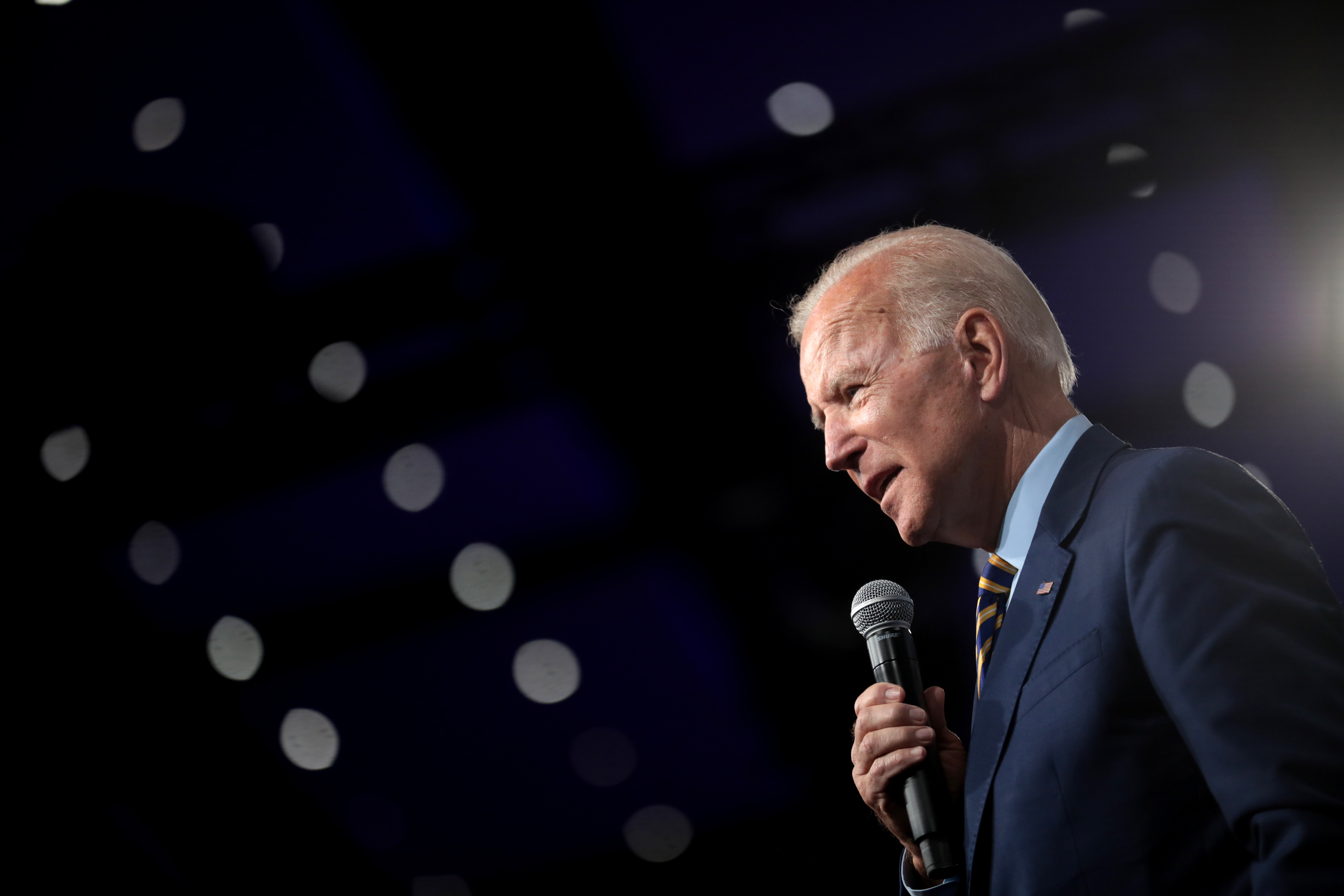

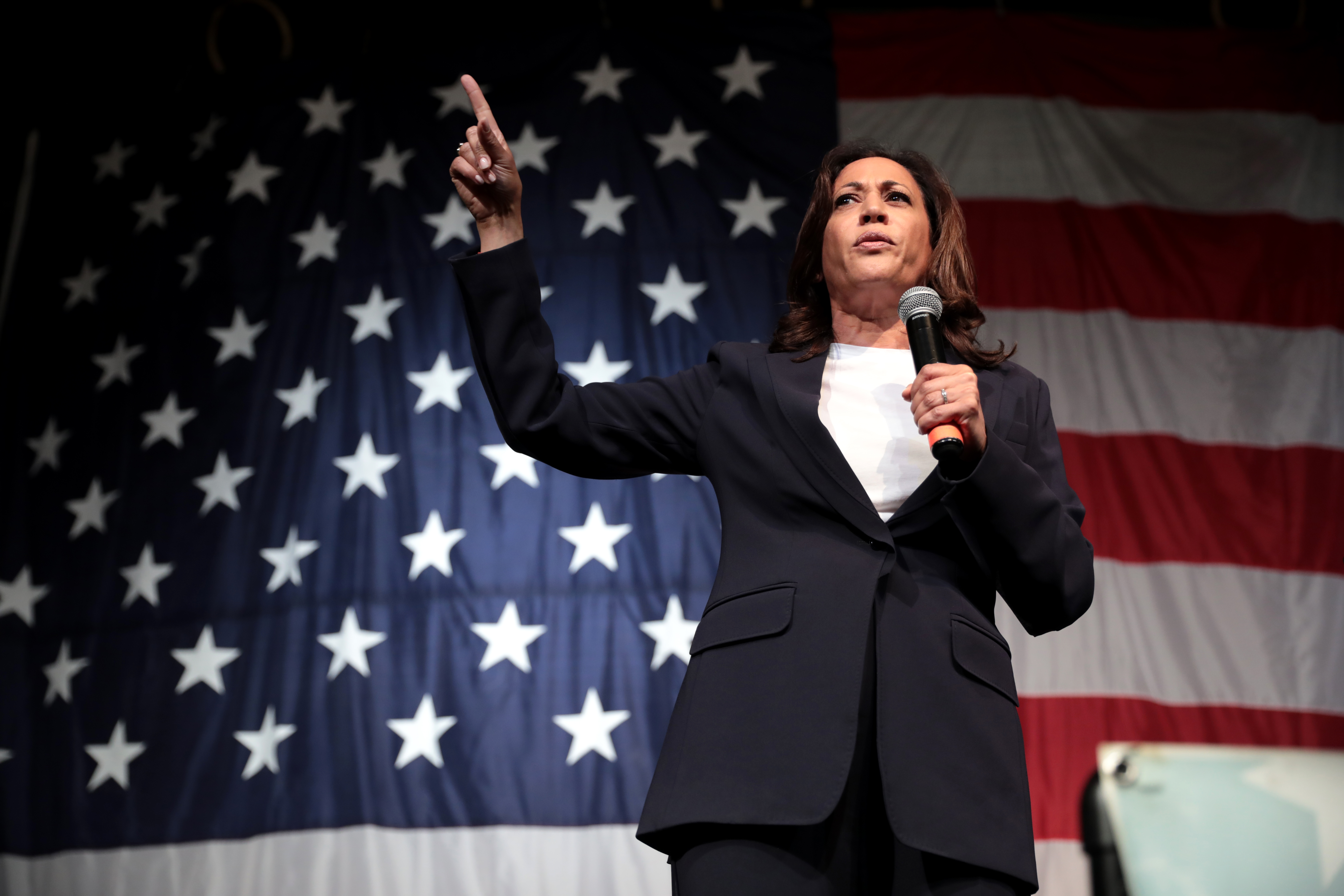

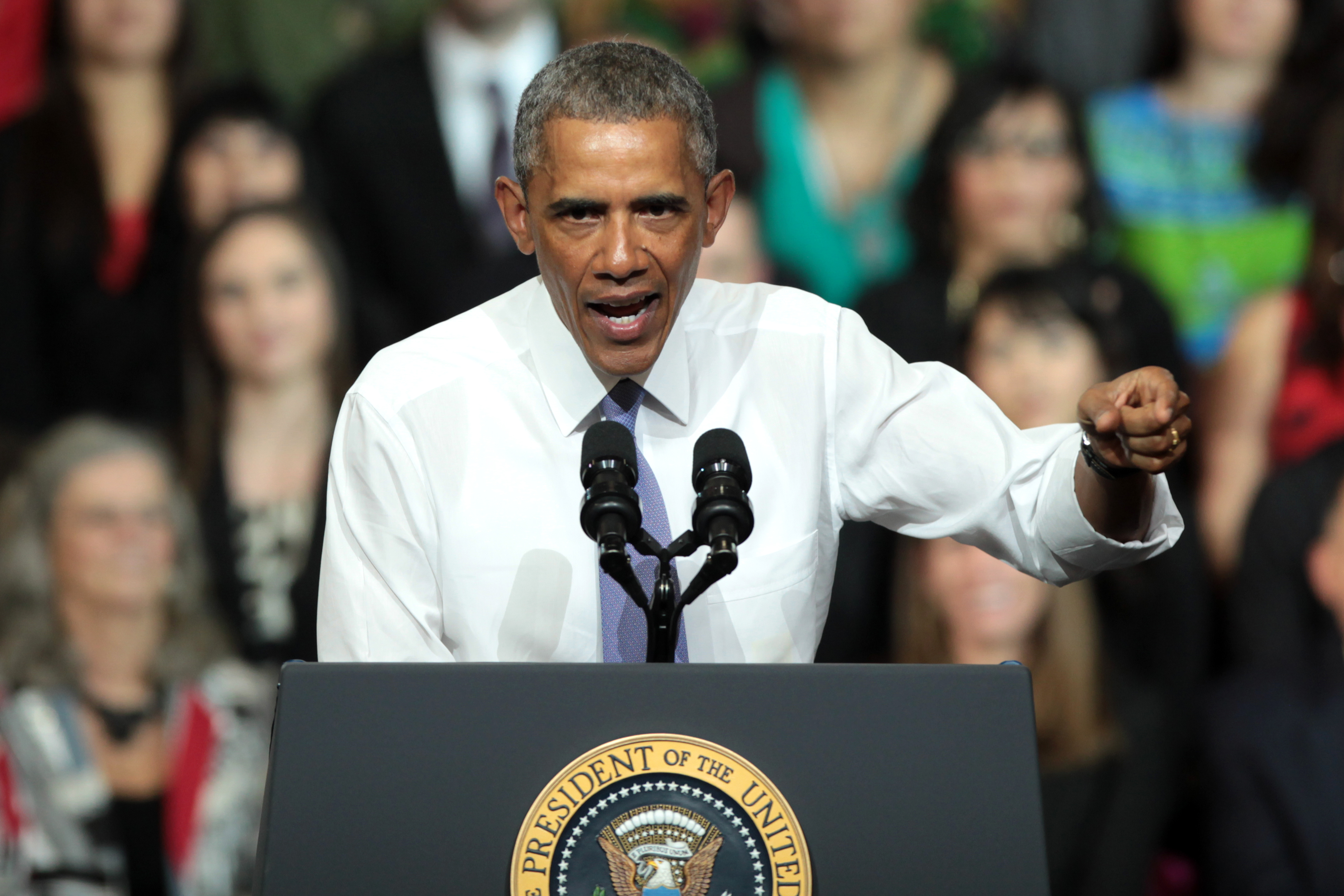

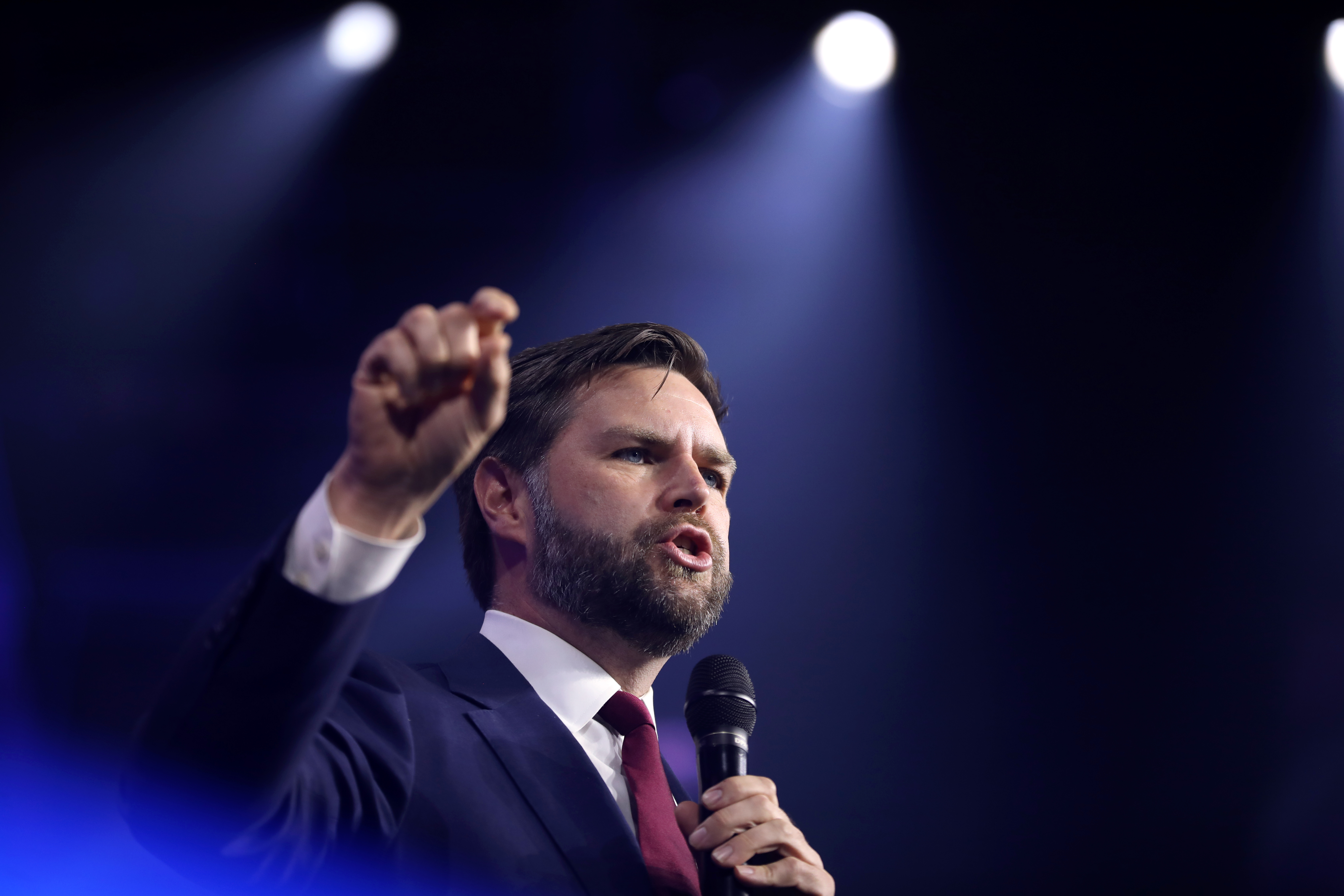

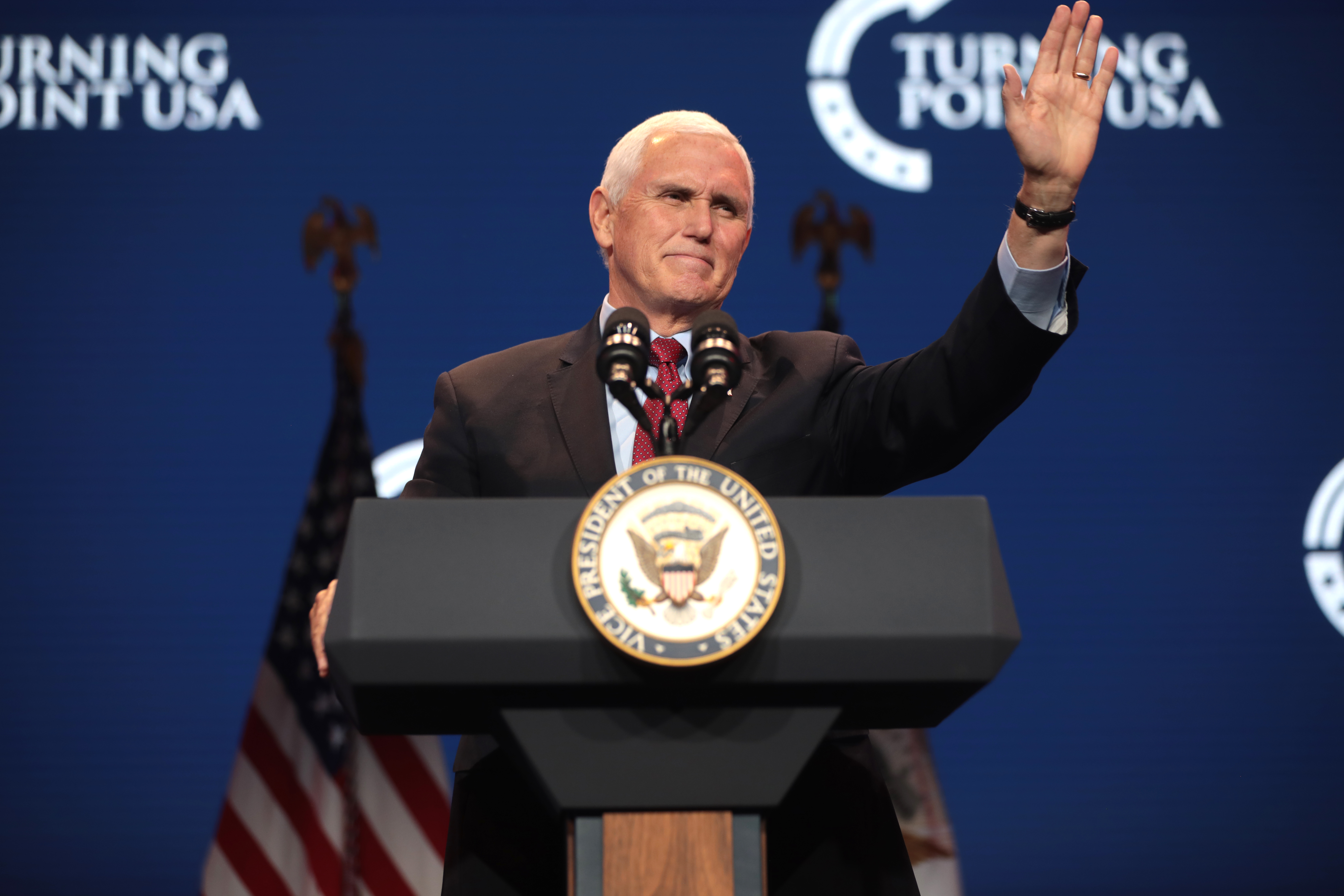

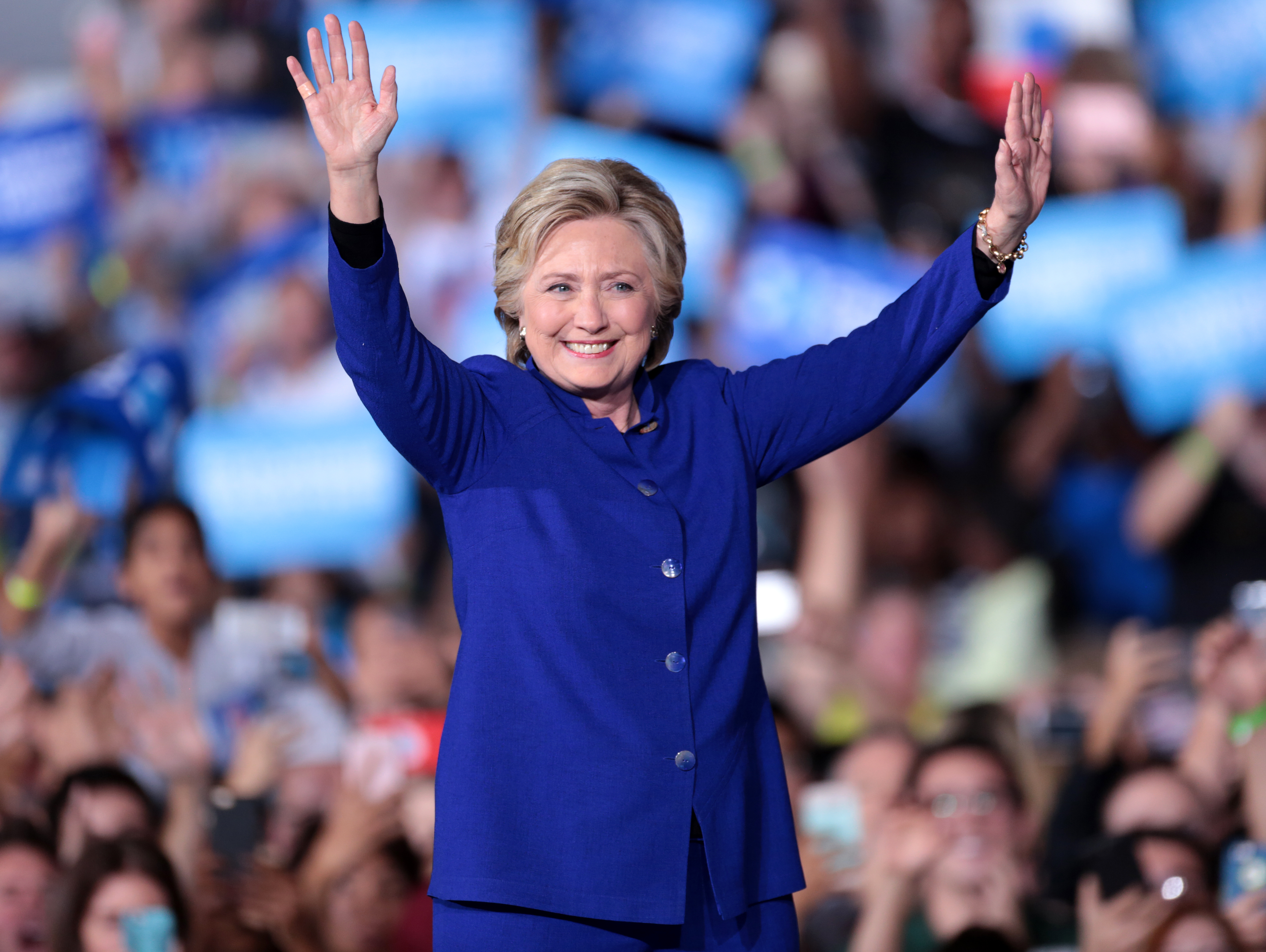

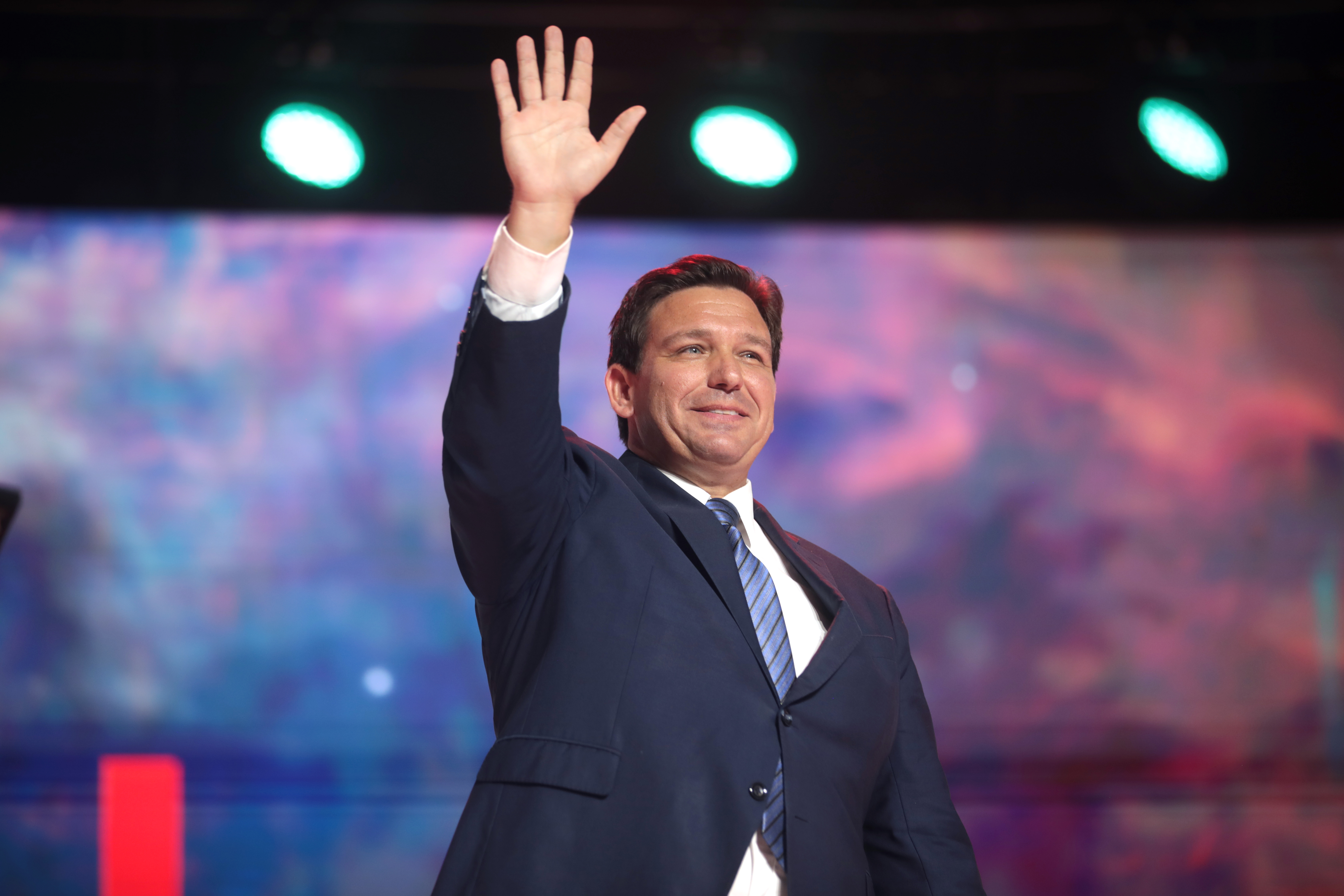

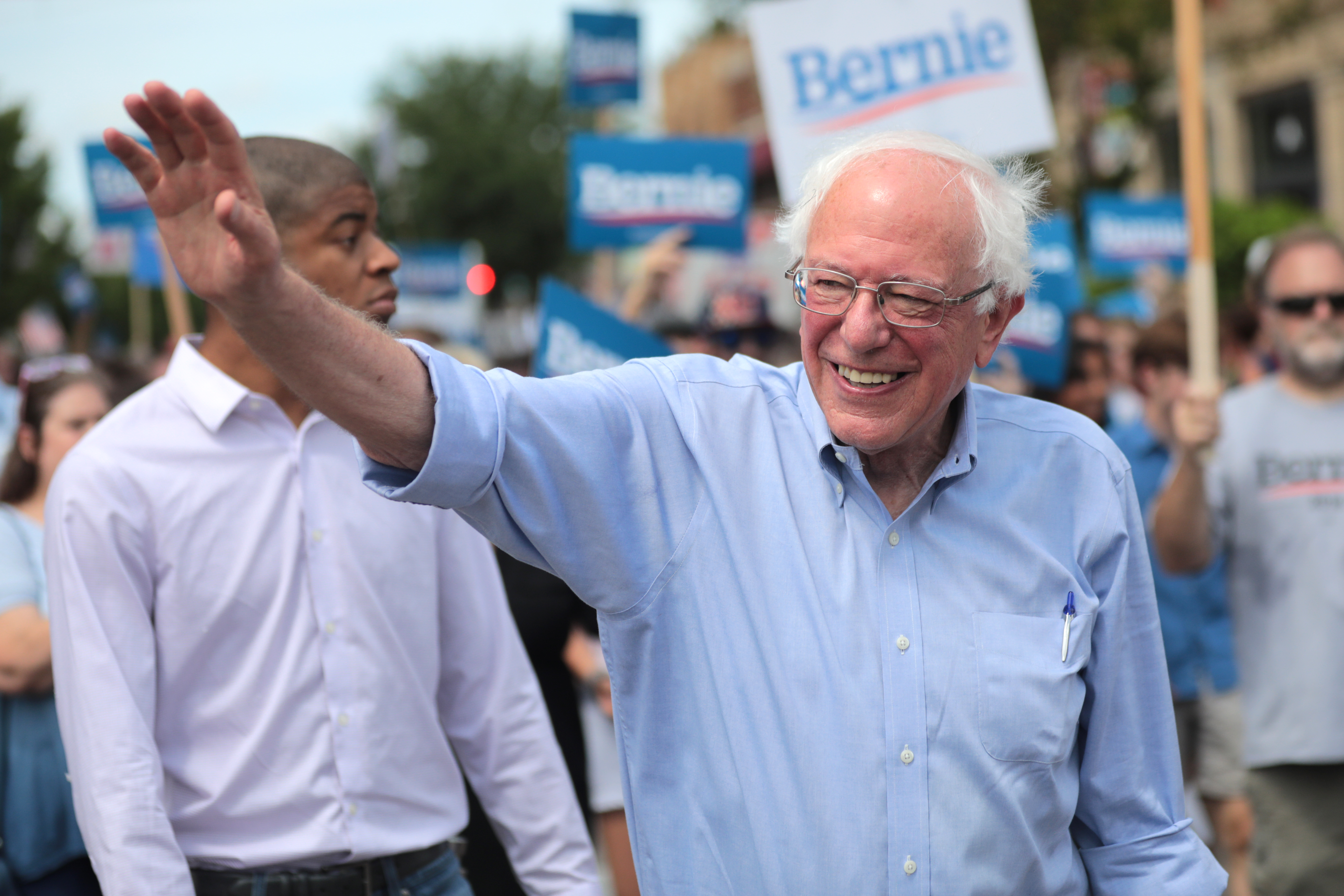

== See also ==
- David Shankbone
