= Wikinews =

Defunct free-content news wiki

- Logo

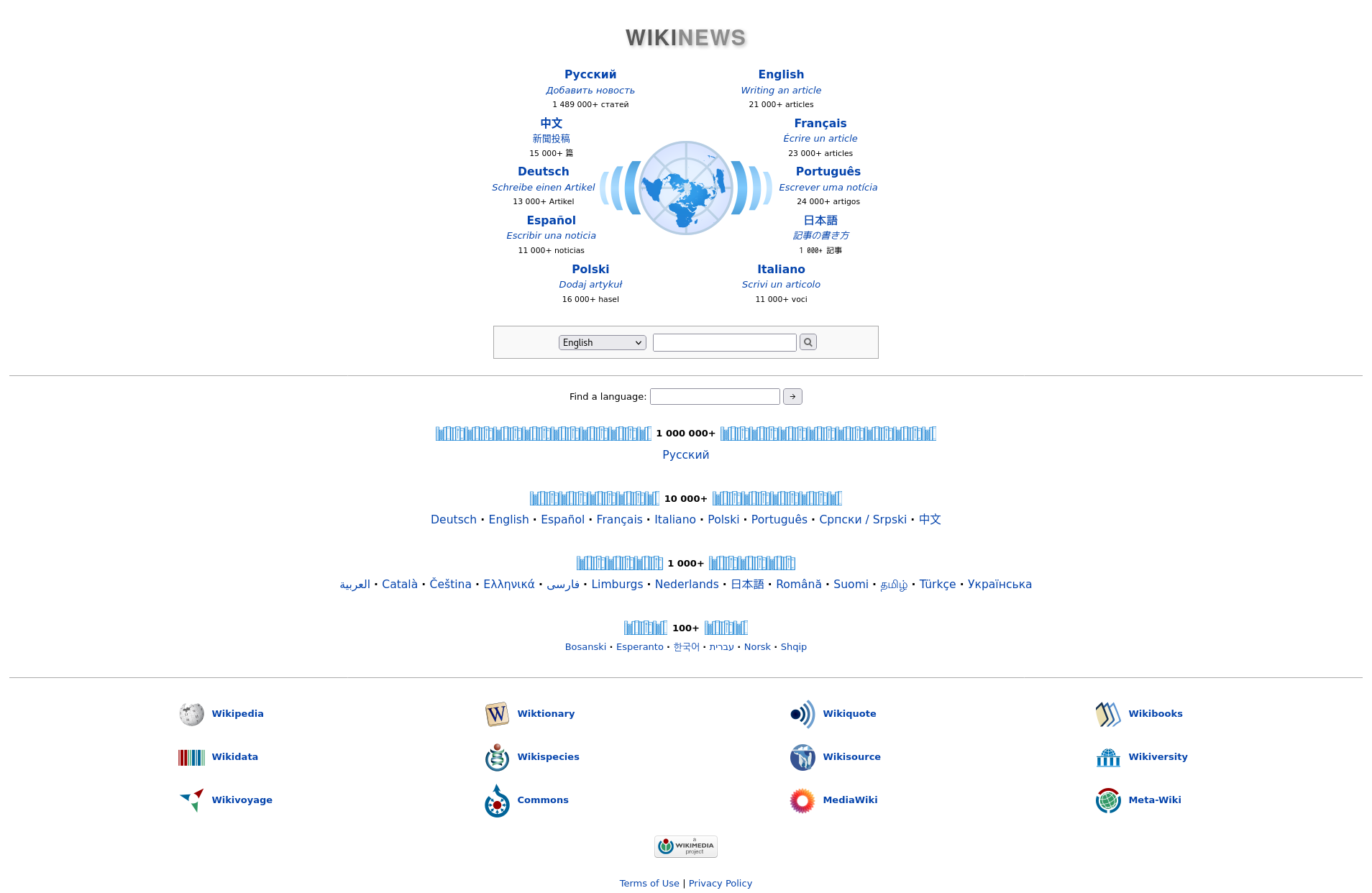
- Screenshot Screenshot of the home page
- Website type: News wiki
- Available in: 31 languages
- List of languages: Albanian; Arabic; Bosnian; Catalan; Chinese; Czech; Dutch; English; Esperanto; Finnish; French; German; Greek; Gun; Hebrew; Italian; Japanese; Korean; Limburgish; Norwegian; Persian; Polish; Portuguese; Romanian; Russian; Serbian; Shan; Spanish; Swedish; Tamil; Ukrainian
- Headquarters: Miami, Florida
- Owner: Wikimedia Foundation
- Creator: Wikimedia community
- Website: wikinews.org
- Commercial: No
- Registration: Optional
- Users: 2,953,817
- Launched: November 8, 2004; 21 years ago
- Current status: Read-only since May 4, 2026; 5 months ago
- Content license: CC-BY 2.5

Wikinews is a discontinued free-content news wiki and a project of the Wikimedia Foundation that gathered and reported news collaboratively through user-created content. Wikipedia co-founder Jimmy Wales has distinguished Wikinews from Wikipedia by saying, "On Wikinews, each story is to be written as a news story as opposed to an encyclopedia article."

On June 28, 2025, the Wikimedia Foundation's Sister Projects Task Force submitted a proposal for closing Wikinews. In March 2026, the WMF announced that Wikinews would be closed and made read-only on May 4 of that year.

== History ==
The beta version logo, used until February 13, 2005

The first recorded proposal of a Wikimedia news site was a two-line anonymous post on January 5, 2003, on the Wikimedia community's Meta-Wiki. Daniel Alston, who edited Wikipedia as Fonzy, claims to have been the one who posted it. The proposal was then further developed by German freelance journalist, software developer, and author Erik Möller. Early opposition from long-time Wikipedia contributors, many of them pointing out the existence of Wikipedia's own news summary, gave way to detailed discussions and proposals about how it could be implemented as a new project of the Wikimedia Foundation.

The domain name wikinews.org was registered on April 2, 2004. In November 2004, a demonstration wiki was established to show how such a collaborative news site might work. A month later, in December 2004, the site was moved out of the "demo" stage and into the beta stage under public domain copyleft. A German language edition was launched at the same time. Soon, editions in Italian, Dutch, French, Spanish, Swedish, Bulgarian, Polish, Portuguese, Romanian, Ukrainian, Serbian, Japanese, Russian, Hebrew, Arabic, Thai, Norwegian, Chinese, Turkish, Korean, Hungarian, Greek, Esperanto, Czech, Albanian, and Tamil (in that chronological order) were set up.

In September 2005, the project moved to the Creative Commons Attribution 2.5 license. On September 7, 2007, the English Wikinews published its 10,000th article.

=== Closure ===
On June 28, 2025, the Wikimedia Foundation's Sister Projects Task Force reviewed a proposal for closing Wikinews, followed by a three-month public consultation.

On March 30, 2026, it was announced by the WMF that Wikinews would be closed and made read-only on May 4 that year.

In an interview on the Fifth Court podcast, Jimmy Wales speculated that the main cause of Wikinews's lack of success was that the wiki community was unable to gain first-hand knowledge of events or communicate with relevant people. According to Wales, these factors limited the wiki's ability to report news independently.

== Interviews ==
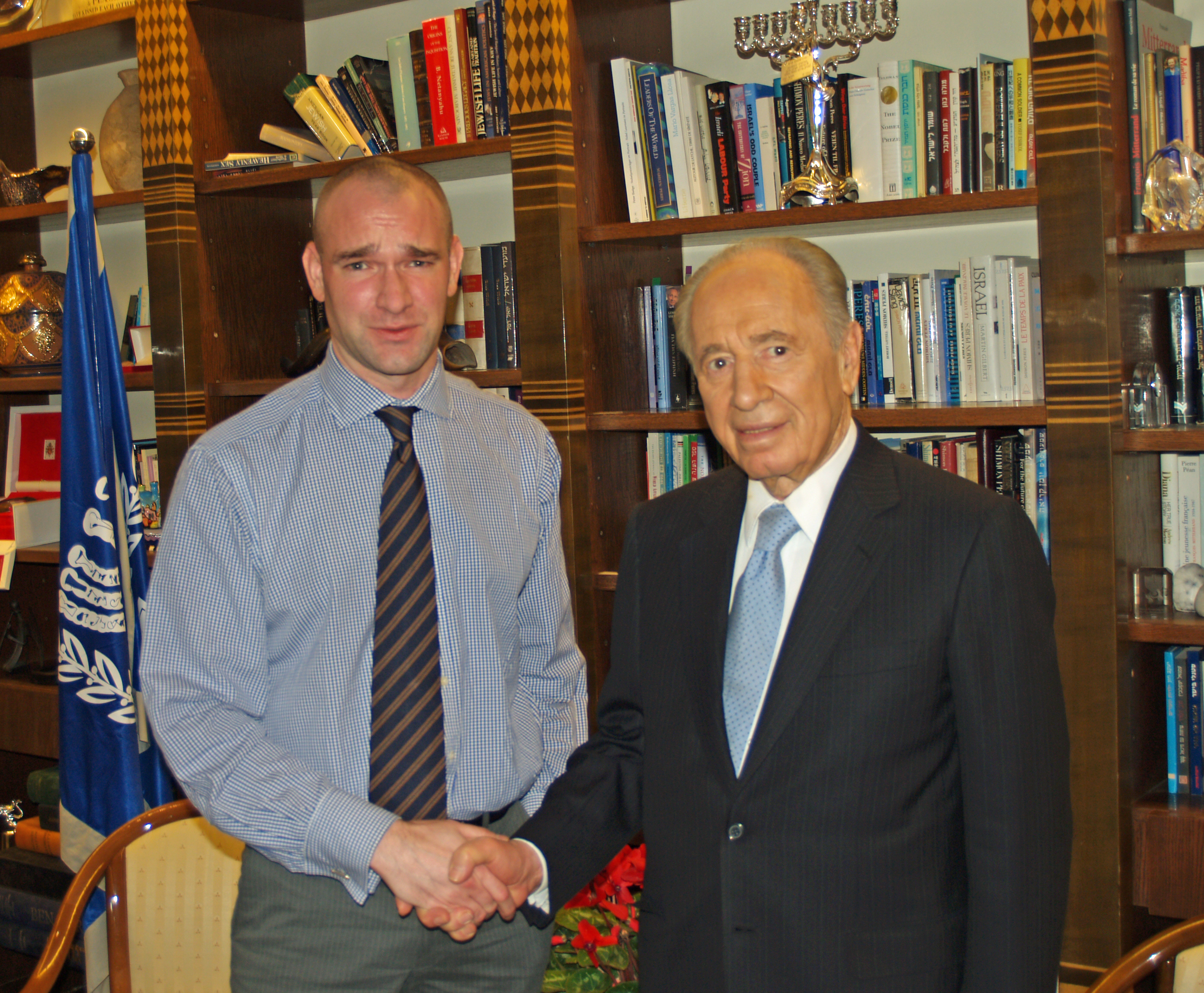
Wikinews reporter David Shankbone with Israeli president Shimon Peres in 2007

Wikinews reporters have conducted interviews with several notable people, including an interview in December 2007 with Israeli President Shimon Peres by Wikinews reporter David Shankbone. Shankbone had been invited to conduct the interview by the America-Israel Friendship League and the Israeli foreign ministry.

Other notable interviews have included writers, actors, and politicians, such as Augusten Burroughs, several 2008 U.S. Republican Party presidential primaries candidates like Sam Brownback and Duncan Hunter, and others like British politician Tony Benn, writer Eric Bogosian, New Zealand politician Nick Smith, former New Zealand prime minister John Key, World Wide Web co-inventor Robert Cailliau, drag queen RuPaul, and former Wikimedia Foundation executive Sue Gardner.

== List ==
As of May 2026, Wikinews content pages have been created in 36 editions, all of which were made read-only on the week of May 4 of that year. The Wikinews sites had a total of 1,742,747 articles.

=== Notes ===
- The "total pages" column refers to the number of pages in all namespaces, including both content pages and non-content pages (user pages, files, talk pages, "project" pages, categories, redirects, and templates).
- "Users" refers to the number of user accounts, regardless of current activity – not the number of people or devices using (accessing) Wikinews.
- "Active users" are registered users who have made at least one edit in the last thirty days.
- "Files" is the number of locally uploaded files.
- The statistics are derived from API:Siteinfo on MediaWiki and updated at Data:Wikipedia statistics/data.tab on Commons every six hours, and are displayed with {{NUMBEROF}} via {{Wikinews stats}}.

=== Edition details ===
Notes cannot be added directly into table header - please see "Notes" section just above

Details of Wikinews editions
Language	Language (local)	Wiki	Content pages	Total pages	Edits	Admins	Users	Active users	Files
Russian	русский	ru	1,473,500	1,986,513	17,980,886	1	64,031	115	1
Serbian	српски / srpski	sr	53,138	81,187	3,180,179	1	7,056	14	0
Portuguese	português	pt	36,989	78,262	600,771	1	30,802	34	62
Polish	polski	pl	24,393	69,984	413,876	1	22,134	102	1,393
French	français	fr	24,204	81,733	915,303	1	56,723	106	1
English	English	en	22,237	265,906	5,027,365	0	2,953,817	1,236	3,345
Chinese	中文	zh	18,686	47,849	286,975	1	38,754	48	1
German	Deutsch	de	14,240	62,504	871,465	1	36,010	22	65
Italian	italiano	it	12,704	44,842	1,008,388	1	29,890	163	114
Spanish	español	es	12,331	50,794	745,941	1	48,408	41	0
Czech	čeština	cs	9,267	18,894	88,733	1	7,162	28	1
Dutch	Nederlands	nl	4,872	15,746	169,289	1	12,196	10	0
Catalan	català	ca	4,801	14,611	179,048	1	10,692	7	0
Japanese	日本語	ja	4,104	36,536	212,644	1	29,866	25	1
Arabic	العربية	ar	3,392	58,926	257,350	1	22,381	65	2
Greek	Ελληνικά	el	3,086	12,845	66,493	1	3,930	10	0
Tamil	தமிழ்	ta	3,053	17,636	60,762	1	7,767	5	0
Limburgish	Limburgs	li	2,630	4,166	26,867	1	1,051	4	0
Swedish	svenska	sv	2,169	8,646	50,082	1	7,267	6	1
Ukrainian	українська	uk	1,986	7,574	51,358	1	7,362	26	0
Persian	فارسی	fa	1,624	19,959	260,151	1	7,917	34	23
Romanian	română	ro	1,480	7,607	40,550	1	12,715	6	0
Turkish	Türkçe	tr	1,184	10,690	275,713	1	5,846	37	10
Esperanto	Esperanto	eo	1,162	12,231	177,613	1	4,487	9	0
Gun	gungbe	guw	1,045	1,763	20,679	1	567	18	0
Korean	한국어	ko	827	4,121	30,968	1	5,450	9	1
Albanian	shqip	sq	740	2,352	9,251	1	2,615	3	0
Norwegian (Bokmål)	norsk	no	624	4,104	22,405	1	4,196	7	2
Shan	တႆး	shn	538	3,928	13,529	0	472	-1	1
Hungarian	magyar	hu	494	5,225	29,627	1	1,478	11	0
Finnish	suomi	fi	464	5,755	59,642	1	4,965	8	1
Bosnian	bosanski	bs	365	4,995	24,303	1	3,090	5	0
Hebrew	עברית	he	281	5,993	51,271	1	5,549	55	54
Bulgarian	български	bg	99	4,044	25,351	1	2,971	9	1
Thai	ไทย	th	25	1,560	4,420	1	1,076	10	0
Sindhi	سنڌي	sd	13	2,093	5,734	1	813	-1	0

==== Statistics totals ====
Selected totals of assets and involved people for all Wikinews editions
	Content pages	Total pages	Edits	Admins	Users	Active users	Files
Total	1,742,747	3,061,574	33,244,982	34	3,461,506	140	5,080

== See also ==
- WikiTribune
- Wikitorial
