= Eddie Matney =

American chef

Eddie Matney is an American host chef, restaurateur, and television personality. He is the owner and executive chef of Eddie's House in Scottsdale, Arizona. He and his family live in Paradise Valley, Arizona.

== Business ==
Matney co-owned and operated the Stockbridge Cafe in the Berkshires of Massachusetts. In 1986, he moved to Arizona to open the restaurant Steamers in Phoenix. His next restaurant, Eddie's Grill, opened in 1988. In September 1998, with his wife Jennifer Blank-Matney as his partner, he opened another restaurant, Eddie Matney's. Matney then opened Wild Noodles, a fast casual restaurant which developed into a nationwide franchise with 20 outlets by 2007, but subsequently failed and is no longer in business. In 2006, Chef Eddie partnered with NBA player Amar'e Stoudemire to open Stoudemire's Downtown. Matney's restaurant, Eddie's House, opened in May 2008 in Scottsdale. Matney owns and operates a catering company under the Eddie's House name.

== Television ==
Matney is a contributor to Your Life A to Z, which airs daily on KTVK. He has also appeared on The Early Show on CBS and "The Today Show" on NBC.

== Books ==
Matney is the author of "Cooking With a Passion" and co-author of the cookbook Heartfelt Cuisine.

== Recognition ==
Matney was named the “Number One Chef in the Valley” for five consecutive years by Phoenix Magazine, he has been celebrated for his culinary style in a number of publications including Food & Wine, USA Today, Bon Appétit, Food Arts, Nation's Restaurant News and Money. As of February 2013, Matney was awarded "Most Influential In Valley Food" in the Best of Our Valley edition for Arizona Foothills. He has also represented the Arizona Cardinals at the "Taste of the NFL" for the past eleven years.

Matney has received many awards for his philanthropic work for the Make-A-Wish Foundation of Arizona, the Sojourner Center, the Phoenix Zoo, Phoenix Theatre and Southwest Autism Research and Resource Center.
