= 2010 Arizona gubernatorial election =

- November 2, 2010
- Turnout: 55.65% ▼4.82pp
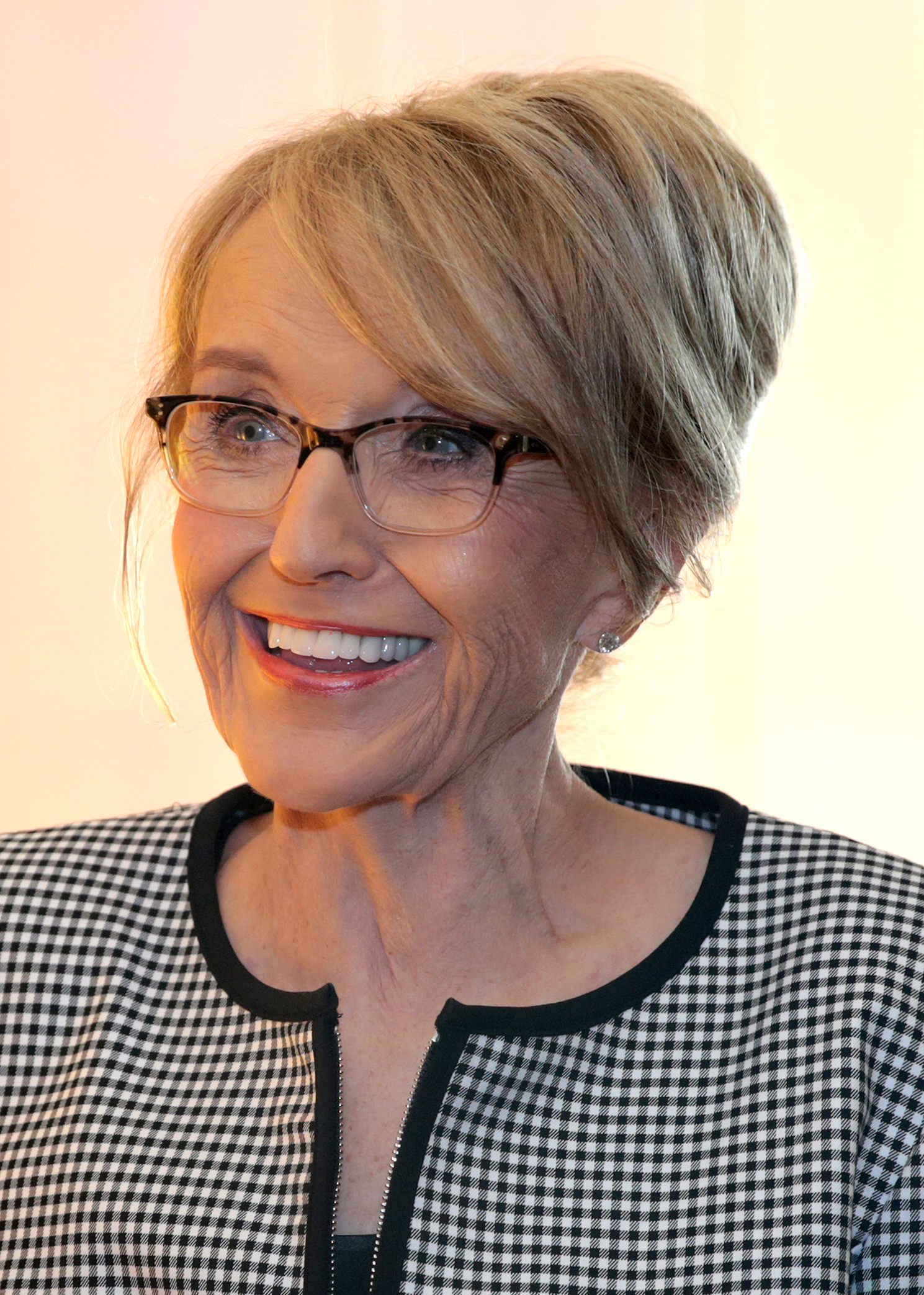

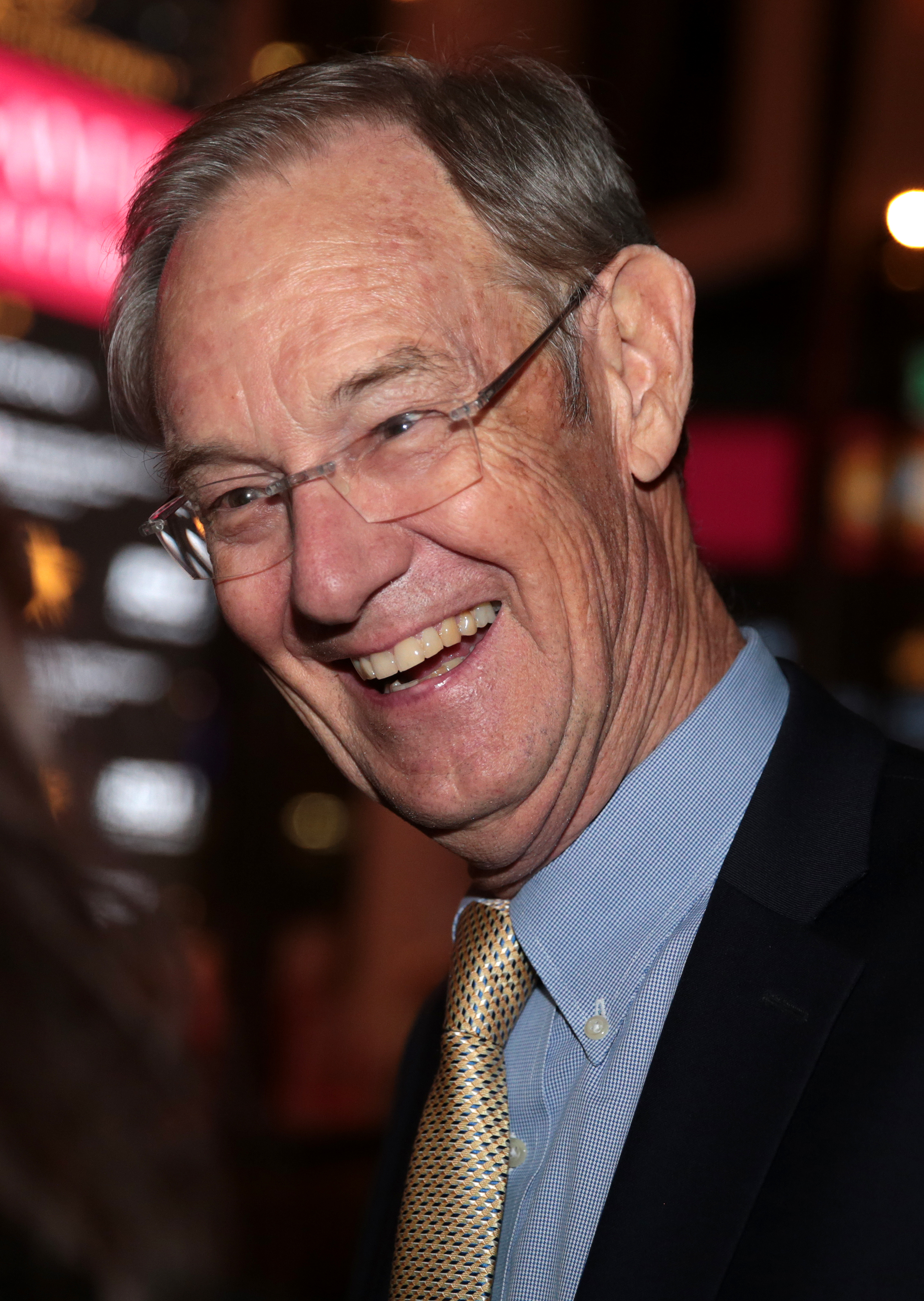
| Nominee | Jan Brewer | Terry Goddard |
| Party | Republican | Democratic |
| Popular vote | 938,934 | 733,935 |
| Percentage | 54.33% | 42.43% |
- Brewer: 40–50% 50–60% 60–70% 70–80% 80–90% >90% Goddard: 40–50% 50–60% 60–70% 70–80% 80–90% >90% Tie: 40–50% 50% No votes
Governor before election
Jan Brewer
Republican
Elected Governor
Jan Brewer
Republican

The 2010 Arizona gubernatorial election was held on November 2, 2010, to elect the governor of Arizona. Incumbent Republican Jan Brewer ran for a full term. Brewer ascended to the governorship following the resignation of the incumbent Democratic Governor Janet Napolitano to become secretary of Homeland Security in the Obama Administration. Primaries were held on August 24, 2010. Brewer won a full term, defeating Arizona Attorney General and Democratic nominee Terry Goddard 54% to 42%.

== Background ==
Democratic Governor Janet Napolitano was term-limited and nominated to become secretary of Homeland Security by President-elect Barack Obama, and was confirmed by the United States Senate on January 20, 2009, resigning as governor the same day. Since Arizona does not have a lieutenant governor, Republican Secretary of State Jan Brewer was first in the state's gubernatorial line of succession and was sworn in as governor upon Napolitano's resignation. Brewer announced on November 5, 2009, that she would seek a full term in 2010.

== Democratic primary ==
=== Candidates ===
==== Declared ====
- Terry Goddard, state attorney general, former mayor of Phoenix, nominee for governor in 1990, and candidate in 1994

==== Declined ====
- Neil Giuliano, former mayor of Tempe
- Phil Gordon, mayor of Phoenix

== Republican primary ==
The primary to select the 2010 Republican nominee for governor of Arizona was held on August 24, 2010.

=== Candidates ===
==== Declared ====
- Jan Brewer, incumbent governor
- Matt Jette

==== Withdrew ====
- Dean Martin, Arizona state treasurer (dropped out on July 9, 2010, and endorsed Brewer)
- Owen Mills, member of the National Rifle Association of America Board of Directors (dropped out on July 13, 2010)

==== Declined ====
- Joe Arpaio, Maricopa County sheriff
- J.D. Hayworth, former U.S. representative
- John Munger, former chair of the Arizona Republican Party
- Vernon Parker, mayor of Paradise Valley (ran for Congress)
- Fife Symington, former governor of Arizona

=== Polling ===
| Poll source | Dates administered | Jan Brewer (inc.) | Dean Martin* | Buz Mills* |
|---|---|---|---|---|
| Rasmussen Reports | June 16, 2010 | 72% | 12% | 16% |
| Rasmussen Reports | May 17, 2010 | 45% | 18% | 18% |
| Public Policy Polling | April 23–25, 2010 | 25% | 15% | 11% |
| Public Policy Polling | April 23–25, 2010 | 58% | 16% | 19% |
| Rasmussen Reports | April 13, 2010 | 26% | 12% | 18% |
| Rasmussen Reports | March 15, 2010 | 20% | 21% | 19% |
| Rasmussen Reports | January 20, 2010 | 29% | 27% | — |
| Rasmussen Reports | November 18, 2009 | 10% | 22% | — |
| Public Policy Polling | September 21, 2009 | 39% | 26% | — |

^{* Dropped out of race after entering to seek the nomination}

=== Results ===
Results by county: Brewer—80–90% Brewer—70–80%

Republican primary results
| Party | Candidate | Votes | % |
|---|---|---|---|
| Republican | Jan Brewer (incumbent) | 479,153 | 81.53 |
| Republican | Buz Mills* | 51,001 | 8.68 |
| Republican | Dean Martin* | 36,012 | 6.13 |
| Republican | Matthew Jette | 19,611 | 3.34 |
| Republican | Write-in | 1,906 | 0.32 |
| Total votes | | 587,683 | 100 |

^{* Dropped out prior to primary, but still appeared on ballot}

== Libertarian primary ==
=== Candidates ===
- Ronald Cavanaugh
- Barry Hess
- Bruce Olsen
- Alvin Ray Yount

=== Results ===
Libertarian primary results
| Party | Candidate | Votes | % |
|---|---|---|---|
| Libertarian | Barry Hess | 1,303 | 43.38 |
| Libertarian | Bruce Olsen | 612 | 20.37 |
| Libertarian | Ronald Cavanaugh | 547 | 18.21 |
| Libertarian | Write-in | 299 | 9.95 |
| Libertarian | Alvin Ray Yount | 243 | 8.09 |
| Total votes | | 3,004 | 100 |

== General election ==
=== Candidates ===
- Jan Brewer (R), incumbent governor
- Larry Gist (G)
- Terry Goddard (D), attorney general
- Barry Hess (L)

=== Predictions ===
| Source | Ranking | As of |
|---|---|---|
| Cook Political Report | Likely R | October 14, 2010 |
| Rothenberg | Lean R | October 28, 2010 |
| RealClearPolitics | Lean R | November 1, 2010 |
| Sabato's Crystal Ball | Likely R | October 28, 2010 |
| CQ Politics | Lean R | October 28, 2010 |

=== Polling ===
| Poll source | Dates administered | Terry Goddard (D) | Jan Brewer (R) |
|---|---|---|---|
| Rasmussen Reports | October 28, 2010 | 39% | 53% |
| Public Policy Polling | October 23–24, 2010 | 44% | 52% |
| BRC Polls | October 11, 2010 | 35% | 38% |
| Rasmussen Reports | October 3, 2010 | 39% | 55% |
| Rasmussen Reports | September 7, 2010 | 38% | 60% |
| Rasmussen Reports | August 25, 2010 | 38% | 57% |
| Rasmussen Reports | July 21, 2010 | 37% | 56% |
| Rasmussen Reports | June 29, 2010 | 35% | 53% |
| Rasmussen Reports | May 17, 2010 | 39% | 52% |
| Rasmussen Reports | April 27, 2010 | 40% | 48% |
| Public Policy Polling | April 23–25, 2010 | 47% | 44% |
| Rasmussen Reports | April 14, 2010 | 40% | 44% |
| Rasmussen Reports | March 16, 2010 | 45% | 43% |
| Rasmussen Reports | January 20, 2010 | 43% | 42% |
| Rasmussen Reports | November 18, 2009 | 44% | 42% |
| Rasmussen Reports | September 27, 2009 | 42% | 40% |
| Public Policy Polling | September 7, 2009 | 46% | 36% |

=== Debate ===
On September 1, the first and only debate was held among all four candidates, moderated by Ted Simons. The debate drew national attention after Jan Brewer "stumbled and stammered" through her opening statements. Afterward, Brewer stated that she would do no more debates.

=== Results ===
Arizona gubernatorial election, 2010
| Party | Candidate | Votes | % | ±% |
|---|---|---|---|---|
| Republican | Janice Kay Brewer (inc.) | 938,934 | 54.33% | +18.89% |
| Democratic | Samuel Pearson Goddard III | 733,935 | 42.43% | −20.11% |
| Libertarian | Barry Hess | 38,722 | 2.24% | +0.27% |
| Green | Larry Gist | 16,128 | 0.93% | |
| Write-ins | | 362 | 0.02% | |
| Majority | | 204,999 | 11.86% | −15.28% |
| Turnout | | 1,728,081 | | |
| Republican hold | | Swing | | |

By county

| County | Jan Brewer Republican | | Terry Goddard Democratic | | Barry Hess Libertarian | | Larry Gist Green | | Write-in | | Margin | | Total votes |
| County | # | % | # | % | # | % | # | % | # | % | # | % | Total votes |
|---|---|---|---|---|---|---|---|---|---|---|---|---|---|
| Apache | 7,002 | 33.89 | 12,839 | 62.14 | 514 | 2.48 | 294 | 1.4 | 10 | 0.04 | -5,837 | -28.25 | 20,659 |
| Cochise | 24,974 | 62.32 | 13,954 | 34.82 | 742 | 1.85 | 398 | 0.99 | 2 | 0.00 | 11,020 | 27.50 | 40,070 |
| Coconino | 16,754 | 43.02 | 20,792 | 53.39 | 880 | 2.25 | 505 | 1.27 | 13 | 0.01 | -4,038 | -10.37 | 38,942 |
| Gila | 11,163 | 62.26 | 6,155 | 34.32 | 451 | 2.51 | 158 | 0.88 | 2 | 0.01 | 5,008 | 27.94 | 17,929 |
| Graham | 5,994 | 65.48 | 2,865 | 31.30 | 220 | 2.40 | 74 | 0.80 | 0 | 0.00 | 3,129 | 34.18 | 9,153 |
| Greenlee | 1,187 | 48.48 | 1,177 | 48.08 | 60 | 2.45 | 24 | 0.98 | 0 | 0.00 | 10 | 0.40 | 2,448 |
| La Paz | 3,048 | 67.31 | 1,330 | 29.37 | 80 | 1.76 | 70 | 1.54 | 0 | 0.00 | 1,718 | 37.94 | 4,528 |
| Maricopa | 543,045 | 54.78 | 415,142 | 41.88 | 24,077 | 2.42 | 8,600 | 0.86 | 280 | 0.02 | 127,903 | 12.90 | 991,144 |
| Mohave | 39,026 | 72.65 | 12,777 | 23.78 | 1,307 | 2.43 | 601 | 1.11 | 4 | 0.00 | 26,249 | 48.87 | 53,715 |
| Navajo | 16,157 | 54.49 | 12,517 | 42.22 | 648 | 2.18 | 317 | 1.06 | 7 | 0.02 | 3,640 | 12.27 | 29,646 |
| Pima | 148,916 | 47.18 | 158,337 | 50.17 | 648 | 0.20 | 317 | 0.10 | 16 | 0.00 | -9,421 | -2.99 | 315,589 |
| Pinal | 45,807 | 58.28 | 30,109 | 38.31 | 1922 | 2.44 | 735 | 0.93 | 18 | 0.02 | 15,698 | 19.97 | 78,591 |
| Santa Cruz | 3,190 | 31.76 | 6,608 | 65.81 | 138 | 1.37 | 105 | 1.04 | 0 | 0.00 | -3,418 | -34.05 | 10,041 |
| Yavapai | 53,081 | 65.21 | 25,569 | 31.41 | 1,830 | 2.24 | 900 | 1.10 | 8 | 0.00 | 27,512 | 33.80 | 81,388 |
| Yuma | 19,590 | 57.22 | 13,764 | 40.20 | 500 | 1.46 | 380 | 1.10 | 2 | 0.00 | 5,826 | 17.02 | 34,236 |
| Totals | 938,934 | 54.33 | 733,935 | 42.43 | 38,722 | 2.24 | 16,128 | 0.93 | 362 | 0.02 | 204,999 | 11.90 | 1,728,081 |

Counties that flipped from Democratic to Republican

- Cochise (largest city: Seirra Vista)
- Gila (largest city: Payson)
- Graham (largest city: Safford)
- Greenlee (largest city: Clifton)
- La Paz (largest city: Parker)
- Maricopa (largest city: Phoenix)
- Mohave (largest city: Lake Havasu City)
- Navajo (largest city: Show Low)
- Pinal (largest city: San Tan Valley)
- Yavapai (largest city: Prescott Valley)
- Yuma (largest city: Yuma)
