= Symington (surname) =

Symington is a surname of Scottish origin. Notable people with the surname include:

- Symington family (United States)
- Colin Fraser Symington (1905–1943), British botanist and forester
- Fife Symington III (born 1945), American politician; Governor of Arizona
- Gaye Symington (born 1954), American politician, Speaker of the Vermont House of Representatives
- Herbert James Symington (1881–1965), Canadian lawyer and aviation businessman
- J. Fife Symington Jr. (1910–2007), American diplomat
- James Ayton Symington (1859–1939), British illustrator
- James H. Symington (1913–1987), American Christian evangelical leader
- James W. Symington (born 1927), American politician; U.S. representative from Missouri
- Marc Symington (born 1980), English cricketer
- Neville Symington (1937–2019), British psychoanalyst
- Sara Symington (born 1969), English cyclist and Olympian
- Stuart Symington (1901–1988), American businessman and politician; U.S. Senator from Missouri
- Stuart Symington (cricketer) (1926–2009), English cricketer and captain of Leicestershire
- William Symington (1764–1831), Scottish engineer and inventor, and steamboat builder
- W. Stuart Symington (diplomat) (contemporary), American diplomat and ambassador
