= Symington =

Symington may refer to:

== People ==
- Symington (surname)
- Symington family (United States), a family of politicians from the United States

== Places ==
- Symington, South Lanarkshire, village in Scotland, one of three named after Simon de Lockart
  - Symington railway station, served the village of Symington in Scotland between 1848 and 1965
- Symington, South Ayrshire, village in Scotland. Named after Simon de Lockart
- Symington, Scottish Borders, village in Scotland, now just a small hamlet, also named after Simon de Lockart
- Symington Islands, in the Antarctic
- Symington House, located in Newark, Essex County, New Jersey, United States
- Symington Yard, the largest of Canadian National Railway's rail classification yard in Canada

== Other uses ==
- Symington Family Estates, major Port wine company
- Symington Amendment, legislation to strengthen the US position on nuclear non-proliferation
