= Henry Clay Frick II =

American physician (1919–2007)

- Born: Henry Clay Frick II; October 18, 1919; New York City, U.S.
- Died: February 9, 2007 (aged 87); Alpine, New Jersey, U.S.
- Other name: Clay Frick
- Education: St. Paul's School; Princeton University; Columbia University
- Occupations: Physician, professor
- Spouses: Jane Allison Coates (m. 1945; div. 1978) Emily Troth du Pont (m. 1997)
- Children: 5
- Parents: Childs Frick (father); Frances Shoemaker Dixon (mother)

Henry Clay Frick II (October 18, 1919 – February 9, 2007) colloquially Clay Frick was an American physician and professor of medicine at the Columbia University College of Physicians and Surgeons.

== Biography ==
Henry Clay Frick II was born on October 18, 1919 in New York City, the son of paleontologist Childs Frick (1883–1965) and his wife, Frances Shoemaker Dixon (1892–1953), and a grandson of his namesake, the coke and steel magnate Henry Clay Frick (1849–1919).

Dr. Frick attended St. Paul's School in Concord, New Hampshire; graduated from Princeton University in 1942; and graduated from the medical school at Columbia College of Physicians and Surgeons in 1944. After World War II, he served in the U.S. Army Medical Corps with the rank of captain. Dr. Frick practiced medicine in New York City, and later became a professor of clinical obstetrics at Columbia, and an oncologist at Columbia Presbyterian Hospital. In the 1960s, he volunteered for two tours of duty in the Vietnam War during which he served in a field hospital.

Dr. Frick was a trustee and board president of New York's Frick Collection and chairman of his aunt's Helen Clay Frick Foundation. In this later capacity he directed the restoration, according to his aunt's wishes, of the Frick family's Pittsburgh estate, Clayton. He also was a trustee of the Wildlife Conservation Society and the American Museum of Natural History.

== Personal life ==
In 1945, Frick married Jane Allison Coates (1924-1996), a daughter of Winslow Shelby Coates, an attorney and conversationist who was primarily active on Long Island, New York, and Jane Coates (née Brush). George de Forest Brush was her maternal grandfather. Her paternal grandfather was from Worcestershire, England. They had five children;

- Jane Allison Frick (1946-1978)
- Elise Dixon Frick
- Adelaide Frick, married to Jotham Allen Trafton, a son of Mr. & Mrs. Willis A. Trafton Jr., an attorney.
- Frances Dixon Frick, known as Sr. Paula of the Serbian Orthodox Church
- Henry Clay Frick III, also known as Clay

His marriage ended in divorce around 1978. Around 1997, Frick remarried to Emily Troth du Pont (née Troth), who previously was married to Richard Simmons du Pont, a private investor of the Du Pont family, with whom she had two children, including Richard Dupont.

Frick died at the age of 87 on February 9, 2007 at his home in Alpine, New Jersey.

== Sources ==
- Sanger, Martha Frick Symington (1998). Henry Clay Frick: An Intimate Portrait. New York: Abbeville Press. ISBN 0-7892-0500-9.
- Sanger, Martha Frick Symington (2007). Helen Clay Frick: Bittersweet Heiress. Pittsburgh: University of Pittsburgh Press. ISBN 9780822943419.
