= Henry Frick (disambiguation) =

Henry Frick may refer to:

- Henry Clay Frick (1849–1919), American industrialist
- Henry Clay Frick II (1919–2007), American physician and professor
- Henry Frick (politician) (1795–1850), American politician and congressman
