= Heiler =

Heiler is a surname. Notable people with the surname include:

- Anne Marie Heiler (1889–1979), German politician
- Friedrich Heiler (1892–1967), German theologian
- Jay Heiler (born 1960), American lawyer
