= Childs Frick =

American paleontologist (1883–1965)

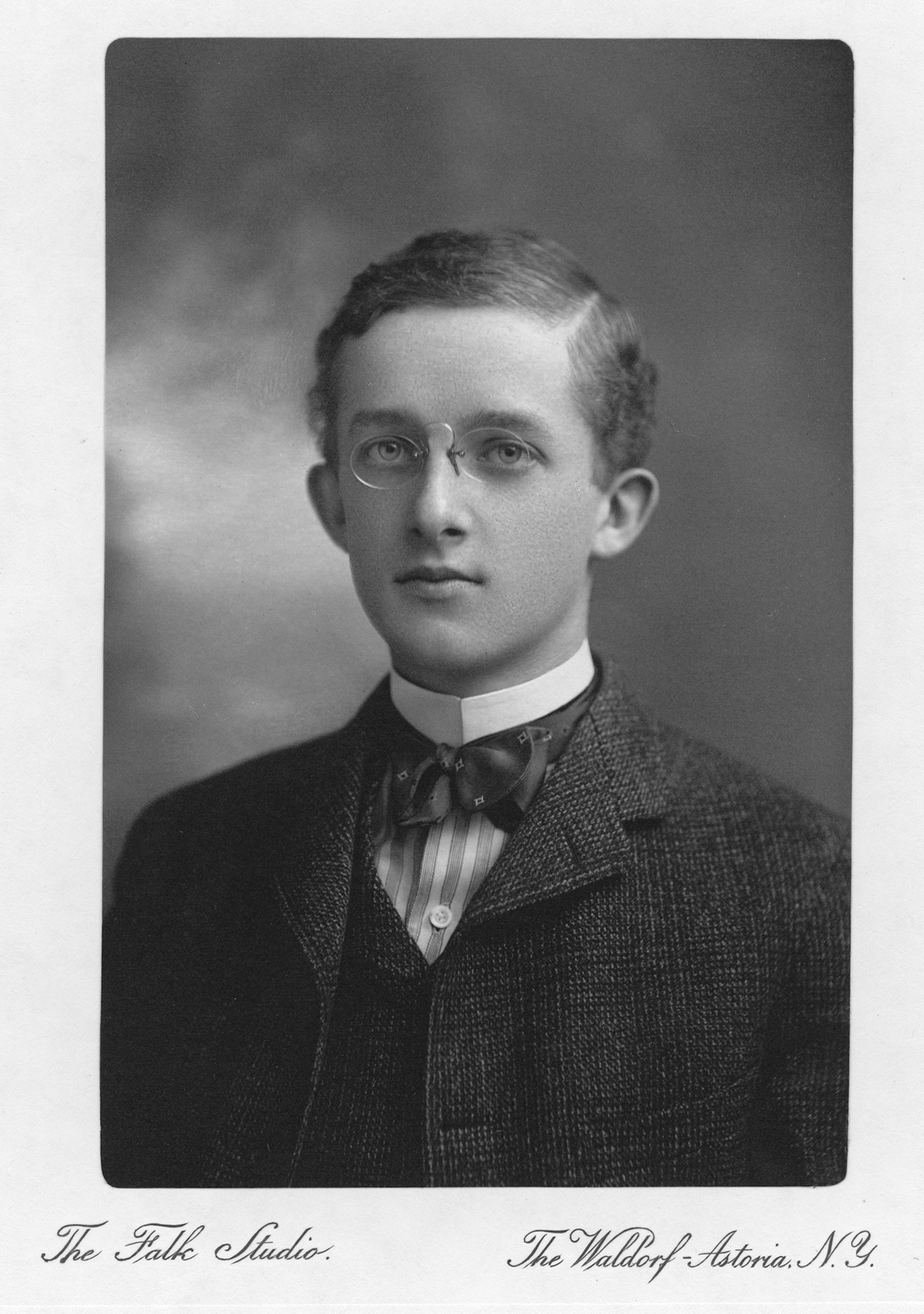
- Born: Childs Frick; March 12, 1883; Pittsburgh, Pennsylvania, United States
- Died: May 8, 1965 (aged 82); Roslyn Harbor, New York, United States
- Burial place: Homewood Cemetery Pittsburgh
- Spouse: Frances Shoemaker Dixon (m. 1913; died 1953)
- Children: 4, including Henry II
- Father: Henry Clay Frick
- Family: Helen Clay Frick

Childs Frick (March 12, 1883 – May 8, 1965) was an American vertebrate paleontologist. He was a trustee of the American Museum of Natural History and a major benefactor of its Department of Paleontology, which in 1916 began a long partnership with him. He established its Frick Laboratory. He also made many expeditions to the American West, and his efforts helped to shape an understanding of the evolution of North American camels. By employing many field workers, Frick accumulated over 200,000 fossil mammals, which later were donated to the Museum.

== Biography ==
Frick was born in Pittsburgh, Pennsylvania, the son of the coke and steel magnate Henry Clay Frick (1849–1919) and Adelaide Howard Childs. He grew up at the family's Pittsburgh estate, Clayton, although the family later moved in 1905 to New York City. He developed his lifelong love for animals playing in the wooded grounds and steep hills behind Clayton, later dedicated as Frick Park. He attended Shady Side Academy in Pittsburgh and graduated from Princeton University in 1905, where he was a member of Colonial Club.

In 1913, Frick married Frances Shoemaker Dixon (1892–1953) of Baltimore, Maryland. The couple had four children: Adelaide, Frances, Martha Howard (Marsie; wife of J. Fife Symington Jr.), and Henry Clay II. As a gift, Frick's father purchased a Georgian-style mansion in Roslyn Harbor, New York, on land that originally belonged to the poet William Cullen Bryant. The couple lived at the estate, named "Clayton" after his childhood home, for more than 50 years.

Henry Clay Frick famously played favorites with his two surviving children, Childs and Helen Clay Frick (1888–1984). After the reading of their father's will, which favored Helen, the two siblings were estranged for the rest of their lives.

Childs Frick was associated with Bermuda, having established a residence in Tucker’s Town, Bermuda. To this day there is a Frick's Point and Frick's Beach. Childs Frick was the philanthropic benefactor who helped support the expedition that rediscovered the Bermuda Petrel or Cahow in 1951 just off his property on an uninhabited island.

Childs Frick died of a heart attack at age 82 in Roslyn. He is interred alongside his wife and parents in the Frick family plot at Pittsburgh's Homewood Cemetery.

In 1969, Frick's Roslyn Harbor estate was purchased by Nassau County for the purpose of conversion into the Nassau County Museum of Art.
