= Symington family (United States) =

American political family

The Symington family (/ˈsaɪmɪŋtən/ SY-ming-tən) is a family of politicians from the United States.

== Family tree of notable members ==
- William Stuart Symington Sr. (1840–1912): m. Lelia Powers
  - W. Stuart Symington Jr. (1870–1926): Maryland state court judge; m. Emily Harrison
    - W. Stuart Symington III (1901–1988): U.S. Secretary of the Air Force (1947–1950), U.S. senator from Missouri (1953–1976); candidate for 1960 Democratic presidential nomination; m. Evelyn Wadsworth, daughter of U.S. senator and U.S. representative James W. Wadsworth Jr. (1877–1952), granddaughter of James W. Wadsworth (1846–1926) and John Hay (1838–1905), and great-granddaughter of James S. Wadsworth (1807–1864)
      - Stuart "Tim" Symington (1925-2025): m. Janey Studt
        - W. Stuart Symington IV (born 1952): U.S. ambassador to Nigeria (2016–2019), to Rwanda (2008–2011), and to Djibouti (2006–2008)
      - James W. Symington (born 1927): U.S. representative from Missouri (1969–1977)
  - Powers Symington (1872–1957): U.S. navy officer; m. Maude Fay, opera singer
  - John Fife Symington Sr. (1877–1950): m. Arabella Hambleton
    - J. Fife Symington Jr. (1910–2007): candidate for U.S. representative from Maryland (1958; 1960; 1962), U.S. ambassador to Trinidad and Tobago (1969–1971); m. Martha Frick, granddaughter of Henry Clay Frick
      - Martha Frick Symington Sanger (born 1941)
      - J. Fife Symington III (born 1945): governor of Arizona (1991–1997)
    - Donald Symington (1924–2013): actor

== See also ==
- List of United States political families
