= Arthur C. Martinez =

American businessperson

- Born: Arthur Caulfield Martinez; September 25, 1939 (age 86); New York City, New York, U.S.
- Education: Polytechnic University (BS); Harvard Business School (MBA)
- Occupations: Businessman, executive
- Known for: Leading Sears, Roebuck & Co
- Spouse: Elizabeth Dorothy Rusch (m. 1966)
- Children: 2
- Relatives: Richard Dupont (son-in-law)
- Awards: CEO of the Year (1996); Alumni Achievement Award (1999)

Arthur C. Martinez (born September 25, 1939) is an American businessman and executive. He is best known as the person who led a turnaround of Sears, Roebuck, and Co. in the 1990s when he was Chairman, CEO and President. He is also credited with turning around retailer Abercrombie & Fitch, of which he was Executive Chairman from 2014-2018.

== Early life and education ==
Martinez was born September 25, 1939 in New York City, the only child of Arthur F. Martinez and Agnes Martinez (née Caulfield). His mother was a homemaker who had immigrated from Ireland and his father was a seafood wholesaler at the Fulton Fish Market in New York City.

He was raised in Brooklyn and graduated high school at age 16. He earned a BS in Mechanical Engineering from Polytechnic University in 1960 at age 20. He then served as an officer with the Army Corps of Engineers in Germany for two years. Upon his return, he entered Harvard Business School and received his MBA in 1965.

== Career ==
Martinez’s first job was stocking shelves at Bohack’s, a now-defunct chain of New York City grocery stores. After receiving his MBA from Harvard Business School, he worked in financial planning at Esso, a brand of Standard Oil (now ExxonMobil). He then worked for International Paper Co. as a business analyst, followed by RCA Records, where he rose to Chief Financial Officer, and later Head of the International Division.

Martinez entered the retail business in 1980 when he became the Chief Financial Officer for Saks Fifth Avenue. In 1987, he became Group CEO for Retail at BATUS, Inc., the owner of Saks. In 1990, he returned to Saks as Vice Chairman for two years.

In 1992, Martinez became CEO of the Sears Merchandise Group and undertook a major restructuring of the business. In January 1993, he began closing 113 unprofitable stores, cutting payroll by 50,000 employees and eliminating the Sears Catalog along with 2,000 catalog outlets. Martinez also introduced the “Softer Side of Sears” ad campaign, which helped attract more women customers.

In 1995, Martinez was named Chairman, CEO and President of the parent company, Sears, Roebuck, and Company. During his eight-year tenure at Sears, Martinez initiated a major overhaul of the company's operations and made the company profitable again. He focused on changing the company culture, emphasizing the importance of customer experience. He remodeled the stores, upgraded the merchandise and added private-brand apparel and cosmetics. In 1995, Sears’s revenue rose 5.9% to $35 billion, with profit growing from $890 million to $995 million and the company’s stock surging 71%.

Martinez retired from Sears as chairman and CEO in 2000. Following his retirement, he served on the boards of over a dozen companies, including HSN; International Flavors & Fragrances Inc.; Martha Stewart Living Omnimedia Inc.; ABN AMRO, the largest bank in the Netherlands; Liz Claiborne; PepsiCo; and AIG following its government bailout. Martinez also served on the boards of numerous organizations such as the Federal Reserve Bank of Chicago, the National Retail Federation, the National Urban League, Polytechnic University, Northwestern University, the Chicago Symphony Orchestra, and Greenwich Healthcare Services, among others.

Martinez wrote about his experience at Sears in the book, The Hard Road to the Softer Side, which was published in 2001 by Crown, a division of Penguin Random House.

In 2007, during his time as supervisory board chairman of ABN Amro, Martinez led the decision to sell the bank to a consortium of European banks in a deal worth €70.5 billion ($100 billion), which at the time was the largest transaction in the history of financial services.

In 2014, Martinez became Executive Chairman of Abercrombie & Fitch, where he is credited with helping turn around the struggling retail company. Some notable changes the company made during his time as Chairman include toning down its provocative marketing and creating a better distinction between the Hollister and Abercrombie brands. Martinez also mentored incoming CEO Fran Horowitz ahead of his retirement from the board in 2018.

=== Honors ===
In 1995, Arthur Martinez was honored with an Edison Achievement Award for his commitment to innovation throughout his career. He was named CEO of the Year in 1996 by Financial World magazine, and in 1998 he received the National Retailer Federation’s Gold Medal Award. Martinez is also a recipient of the Harvard Alumni Achievement Award, the school’s highest honor, as well as honorary degrees from Notre Dame and Polytechnic University.

== Personal life ==
On July 30, 1966, Martinez married Elizabeth Dorothy Rusch, a daughter of Forrest B. Rusch of Cleveland, Ohio, at St. Vincent Ferrer Roman Catholic Church in New York City. Elizabeth has been a member of the board of directors for a number of organizations, including the Chicago Zoological Society, the Chicago Public Library Foundation, the Women's Board of the Brookfield Zoo, and the Women's Board of the Lyric Opera of Chicago. Arthur and Elizabeth have two children and five grandchildren. Their daughter Lauren Martinez (born 1970) is married to Richard S. DuPont, Jr. and their son Gregory Arthur Martinez (born 1974) is married to Caroline Leventhal.

Martinez and his wife are residents of Hobe Sound, Florida, Greenwich, Connecticut, and Northeast Harbor, Maine.
