= Eddie Basha Jr. =

American businessman (1937–2013)

Eddie Basha
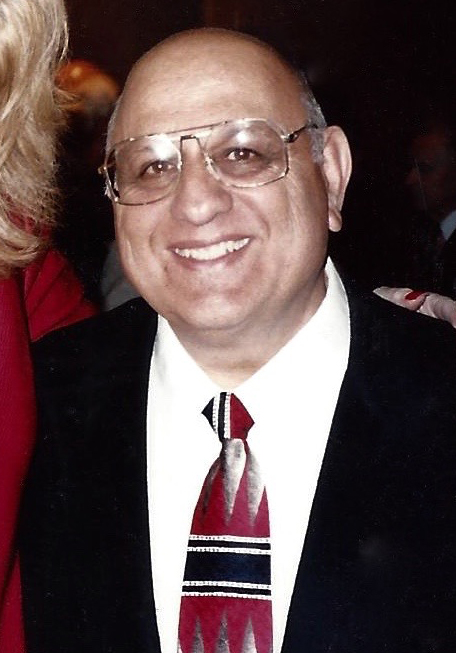

Personal details
- Born: August 24, 1937 Chandler, Arizona, U.S.
- Died: March 26, 2013 (aged 75) Chandler, Arizona, U.S.
- Party: Democratic
- Education: Stanford University (BA)

Edward Najeeb Basha Jr. (August 24, 1937 – March 26, 2013) was the chairman & CEO of Bashas', Inc., a grocery store chain in Arizona. His father, Eddie Basha Sr., and his uncle, Ike Basha, founded Bashas' in 1932. The first store under the Bashas' banner was opened in Chandler, Arizona.

Basha ran for Governor of Arizona in 1994 and won the Democratic nomination. However, he lost to incumbent Republican governor Fife Symington. Basha died on March 26th, 2013, at the age of 75.

== Early life and education ==
Basha was born in Chandler, Arizona, where his father owned a grocery business. The Bashas were originally from Lebanon, entering the United States by way of New York City. They moved from New York City to Arizona in 1910. He graduated from Chandler High School and then obtained a degree in History at Stanford University.

== Career ==
Bashas' was founded by Eddie Basha Sr. and brother Ike Basha. Upon the death of Ike, Eddie Basha Sr. continued running Bashas'. Eddie Basha Jr. took full control of the family business upon the death of his father. Beginning in 1968, Basha expanded the small company to a nationwide chain of 160 stores.

Basha ran an unsuccessful campaign as the Democratic nominee against incumbent Arizona Governor Fife Symington in 1994. He was a supporter of many charitable and civic causes, particularly working with education and the poor in Arizona. He supported same-sex marriage during his gubernatorial campaign, years before it became an issue for contemporary society in the early 21st century.

== Personal life and death ==
Basha was a member of the Roman Catholic Church.

He was a collector of Western American and American Indian art. In 1992 he carved out a space in the corporate offices of Bashas' (Chandler, AZ) and created an art gallery where the collection remains available for public viewing free of charge. Masterworks of the collection has been loaned to Museums across the nation such as The Autry (Los Angeles CA), The Booth Museum (Cartersville, GA), The Rockwell Museum (Corning, NY), Western Spirit: Scottsdale Museum of the West (Scottsdale, AZ), the Heard Museum (Phoenix, AZ), the Eiteljorg Museum (Indianapolis, IN) and many others. As a collector, he was more apt to acquire masterworks of contemporary artists whom he met and developed lifelong friendships with.

Basha was also a passionate and ardent supporter of education. He served consecutive terms on the Chandler Unified School District governing board, the Arizona State Board of Education, and as a member of the Arizona Board of Regents. Along with his wife, Nadine Mathis Basha, and Rhian Evans Allvin, First Things First, an early childhood (ages 0–5) statewide program passed a ballot initiative that funded the development, health and education of young children. It was a milestone achievement which Basha said would benefit the lives of millions of children throughout Arizona. Arizona was the second state to pass such a program.

In addition, Basha devoted countless hours toward the plight of the homeless and hungry, health care issues, a proponent of the arts, numerous political referendums and many other community and civic projects as well.

Basha died on March 26, 2013, and is survived by his wife Nadine Mathis Basha, and sons Eddie III, Ike, Mike, David, Josh and Jeremy.

Party political offices
| Preceded by Terry Goddard | Democratic nominee for Governor of Arizona; 1994 | Succeeded by Paul Johnson |
