= 1994 Arizona gubernatorial election =

- November 8, 1994
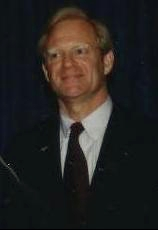

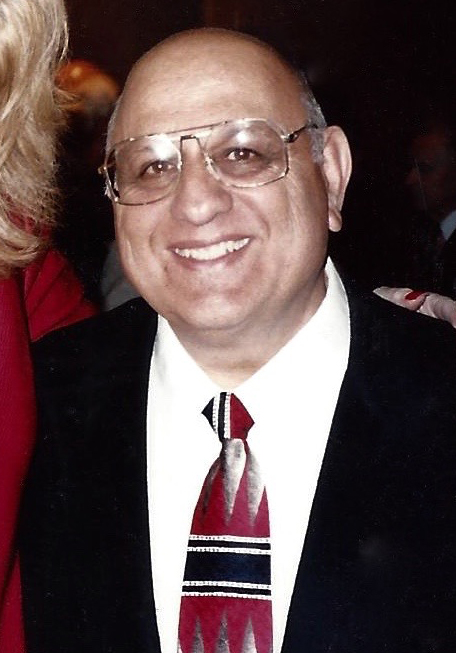
Nominee	Fife Symington	Eddie Basha
Party	Republican	Democratic
Popular vote	593,492	500,702
Percentage	52.54%	44.33%
- County results Symington: 40–50% 50–60% 60–70% Basha: 50–60% 70–80%
Governor before election
Fife Symington
Republican
Elected Governor
Fife Symington
Republican

The 1994 Arizona gubernatorial election took place on November 8, 1994, for the post of Governor of Arizona. Fife Symington, the incumbent Republican Governor of Arizona, defeated the Democratic nominee Eddie Basha to win a second term in office. However, Symington resigned in 1997 due to a federal indictment on corruption charges.

== Republican primary ==
In the Republican primary, incumbent Governor Fife Symington was challenged by businesswoman Barbara Barrett, wife of business executive Craig Barrett. Symington announced his primary campaign by stating, "I vowed to get state spending under control, reduce taxes and do my best to promote economic development and restore strength to the economy. I think I am in a strong position because I accomplished my goals." Barrett spent more than $1 million of her own money in the attempt to defeat Symington, who she stated she did not dislike personally, but simply felt that she could do a better job as governor.

On September 13, 1994, Symington defeated Barrett in the primary by a margin of 68% to 32%. Political analysts stated that Barrett had failed to distinguish herself from the incumbent governor, and ran a flawed campaign.

=== Candidates ===
- Barbara Barrett, businesswoman
- Fife Symington, incumbent governor

=== Results ===
Republican primary results
Party	Candidate	Votes	%
Republican	Fife Symington (incumbent)	202,588	68.14%
Republican	Barbara Barrett	94,740	31.86%
Total votes		297,328	100.00%

== Democratic primary ==
In the Democratic primary, 1990 Democratic gubernatorial nominee and former Phoenix Mayor Terry Goddard attempted to seek the Democratic nomination once again, but was challenged by Paul Johnson, who was also a former mayor of Phoenix, and Arizona Board of Regents member Eddie Basha, more famous for his involvement with the grocery store chain Bashas'. In the primary held on September 13, Basha defeated Goddard by a very small margin, with Johnson receiving a sizable level of support as well.

=== Candidates ===
- Eddie Basha, Arizona Board of Regents and businessman
- Terry Goddard, former mayor of Phoenix and 1990 Democratic gubernatorial nominee
- Paul Johnson, former mayor of Phoenix

=== Results ===
Democratic primary results
Party	Candidate	Votes	%
Democratic	Eddie Basha	96,613	36.82%
Democratic	Terry Goddard	92,239	35.16%
Democratic	Paul Johnson	73,512	28.02%
Total votes		262,364	100.00%

== General election ==
Following the 1990 election, in which a run-off election was held in order to deter the possibility of a candidate winning with less than a plurality of all of the votes cast, as was the case with the 1986 election in which Evan Mecham was elected with only 39.96% of the vote, the 1994 election did not have a runoff. This was due to a measure that was approved by voters to eliminate the runoff system, which was marred by a longer than usual campaign and issues surrounding the date of when the runoff should be held.

=== Results ===
Arizona gubernatorial election, 1994
Party	Candidate	Votes	%	±%
Republican	Fife Symington (incumbent)	593,492	52.54%	+0.18%
Democratic	Eddie Basha	500,702	44.33%	−3.31%
Libertarian	John A. Buttrick	35,222	3.11%	+3.09%
Independent	John Wright (write-in)	121	0.01%	
Democratic	Caroline P. Killeen (write-in)	29	0.00%	
Independent	Walter L. Bassett (write-in)	11	0.00%	
Republican	Charles M. Crawford (write-in)	11	0.00%	
Democratic	S. Roberts (write-in)	11	0.00%	
Republican	Will Davis, II (write-in)	5	0.00%	
Independent	Ilias Kostopoulos (write-in)	3	0.00%	
Majority		92,790	8.21%	
Total votes		1,129,607	100.00%	
Republican hold		Swing	+3.49%	

=== Results by county ===
County	Fife Symington Republican		Eddie Basha Democratic		John A. Buttrick Libertarian		All Others Write-in		Margin		Total votes cast
County	#	%	#	%	#	%	#	%	#	%	Total votes cast
Apache	4,229	24.78%	12,409	72.72%	423	2.48%	2	0.01%	-8,180	-47.94%	17,063
Cochise	15,203	57.13%	10,647	40.01%	759	2.85%	4	0.02%	4,556	17.12%	26,613
Coconino	13,971	43.25%	17,110	52.97%	1,213	3.76%	8	0.02%	-3,139	-9.72%	32,302
Gila	6,978	45.70%	7,770	50.89%	520	3.41%	1	0.01%	-792	-5.19%	15,269
Graham	4,570	58.48%	3,101	39.69%	143	1.83%	0	0.00%	1,469	18.80%	7,814
Greenlee	1,522	51.77%	1,358	46.19%	59	2.01%	1	0.03%	164	5.58%	2,940
La Paz	1,850	49.47%	1,773	47.41%	117	3.13%	0	0.00%	77	2.06%	3,740
Maricopa	349,473	54.31%	272,298	42.31%	21,623	3.36%	141	0.02%	77,175	11.99%	643,535
Mohave	19,315	58.71%	12,656	38.47%	922	2.80%	8	0.02%	6,659	20.24%	32,901
Navajo	9,780	43.95%	11,949	53.69%	524	2.35%	2	0.01%	-2,169	-9.75%	22,255
Pima	107,287	49.30%	104,669	48.10%	5,637	2.59%	7	0.00%	2,618	1.20%	217,600
Pinal	13,755	44.52%	16,338	52.88%	794	2.57%	7	0.02%	-2,583	-8.36%	30,894
Santa Cruz	2,856	41.12%	3,978	57.27%	112	1.61%	0	0.00%	-1,122	-16.15%	6,946
Yavapai	29,213	60.00%	17,584	36.11%	1,882	3.87%	10	0.02%	11,629	23.88%	48,689
Yuma	13,490	64.10%	7,062	33.56%	494	2.35%	0	0.00%	6,428	30.54%	21,046
Totals	593,492	52.54%	500,702	44.33%	35,222	3.12%	191	0.02%	92,790	8.21%	1,129,607

==== Counties that flipped from Democratic to Republican ====
- Cochise
- Greenlee
- Pima
- Yuma
