= Terry Goddard =

American politician (born 1947)

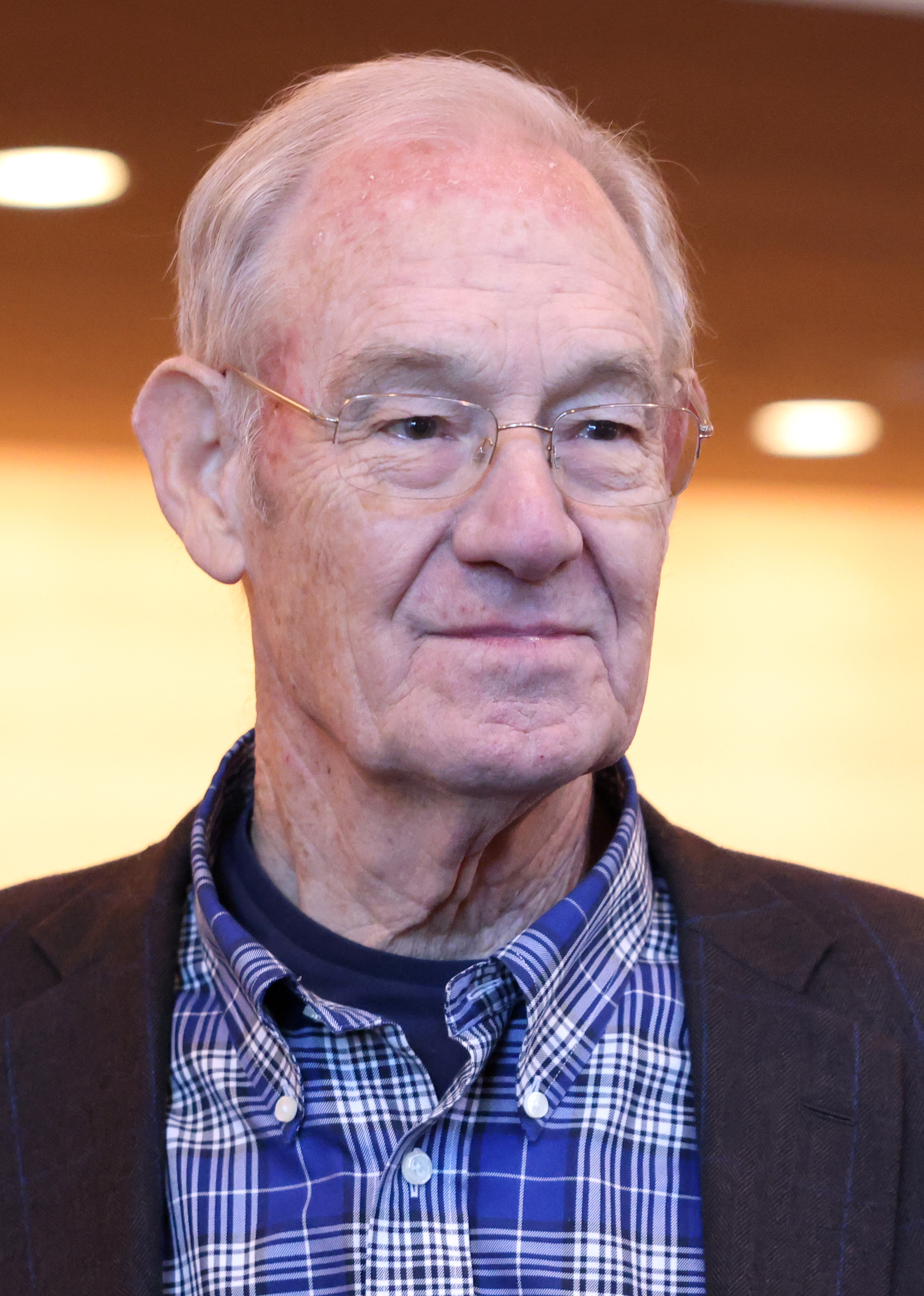
- Goddard in 2026

24th Attorney General of Arizona
- In office January 6, 2003 – January 3, 2011
- Governor: Janet Napolitano; Jan Brewer
- Preceded by: Janet Napolitano
- Succeeded by: Tom Horne

53rd Mayor of Phoenix
- In office January 2, 1984 – February 16, 1990
- Preceded by: Margaret Hance
- Succeeded by: Paul Johnson

63rd President of the National League of Cities
- In office 1989
- Preceded by: Pamela P. Plumb
- Succeeded by: Bob Bolen

Personal details
- Born: Samuel Pearson Goddard III; January 29, 1947 (age 79) Tucson, Arizona, U.S.
- Party: Democratic
- Spouse: Monica Goddard
- Education: Harvard University (BA); Arizona State University, Tempe (JD)

Military service
- Allegiance: United States
- Branch/service: United States Navy
- Years of service: 1970–1972 (Active); 1969, 1973–1998 (Reserve)
- Rank: Commander
- Unit: United States Navy Reserve

Samuel Pearson "Terry" Goddard III (born January 29, 1947) is an American attorney and politician who served as the mayor of Phoenix, Arizona from 1984 to 1990 and as the 24th attorney general of Arizona from 2003 to 2011. He is a member of the Democratic Party.

Goddard served on the Central Arizona Water Conservation District from 2001 to 2003. He has twice run for governor of Arizona, in 1990 and in 2010, losing both elections to Fife Symington and Jan Brewer respectively. After leaving office as attorney general, he led his own law firm, Goddard Law Office, PLC. He declined to run for governor for a third time in 2014 and was instead the Democratic nominee for Secretary of State of Arizona in the 2014 elections, losing to Republican state senator Michele Reagan. Goddard was a potential candidate for governor in 2018 and chose not to run.

== Early life, education and career ==
Goddard was born and raised in Tucson, Arizona, the son of Julia E. "Judy" (née Hatch) and Samuel Pearson Goddard Jr., who served as Governor of Arizona from 1965 to 1967. His great-grandfather, Ozias M. Hatch, was Illinois Secretary of State 1857 to 1865. He attended Phillips Exeter Academy, a prep school in Exeter, New Hampshire. After graduating from Harvard College in 1969, he served an active duty tour in the U.S. Navy. Returning to Arizona, he received his J.D. degree from Arizona State University in 1976. His time as a private attorney saw him working in the Arizona Attorney General's office, where he prosecuted white collar crime. Goddard is married and has one son.

== Early political career ==
Goddard's first serious foray into electoral politics came in 1982, when he led the successful push for members of the Phoenix City Council to be elected from districts, instead of by a majority of all voters citywide. This allowed minorities from certain parts of Phoenix to be elected and represent their home areas and giving those areas a voice on the council. The next election saw the election of the city's first Latino and African-American to the council in over a decade. The measure is credited with significantly opening up Phoenix city government, and in 1983, Goddard was elected mayor. Within a decade, all of the members of the City Council who had been elected at-large, and who had been considered unbeatable under the previous system, were no longer serving on the council. Goddard was re-elected four times, serving through 1990, when he resigned to run for governor. In 1988, he was elected president of the National League of Cities.

In 1990, Goddard sought and won the Arizona Democratic Party's nomination for Governor of Arizona, but was defeated in a runoff by Fife Symington, who, after winning a second term, resigned in 1997 amid charges of bank fraud. Goddard again sought the Democratic nomination for governor in 1994, losing the primary to Eddie Basha Jr.

Goddard served as Arizona State Director for the U.S. Department of Housing and Urban Development from 1995 to 2002 and in 2000, he was elected to the Central Arizona Water Conservation District, which oversees the Central Arizona Project, where he currently serves at the President. In the non-partisan election in which the top five candidates are elected, Goddard came first, with 403,568 votes (19.74%).

In 2002, Goddard decided to enter the race for Attorney General of Arizona to succeed fellow Democrat Janet Napolitano, who was running for governor. He was elected that year with a greater margin than Napolitano received for governor, receiving over 50% of the vote; he and a number of other candidates for office that year ran publicly financed campaigns under Arizona's Clean Elections program.

Goddard was re-elected to the office of attorney general in 2006 with 60% of the vote. After Napolitano resigned to become United States Secretary of Homeland Security in January 2009 and was succeeded by Secretary of State Jan Brewer, Goddard was next in line to succeed Brewer. Although the secretary of state is ordinarily next in line to succeed the governor, new secretary of state Ken Bennett had been appointed and was not eligible, so Goddard was next in line to succeed Brewer.

== Arizona Attorney General, 2003–2011 ==
Goddard's stated focus as attorney general was cybercrime, consumer protection, predatory lending and foreclosures, and deceptive advertising. He also worked to reduce teen use of the drug methamphetamine, and partnered with Utah Attorney General Mark Shurtleff to investigate and prosecute suspected polygamists and government abuse of the neighboring communities of Colorado City, Arizona and Hildale, Utah. This led to the capture of polygamist leader and self-proclaimed prophet Warren Jeffs. A hallmark accomplishment during his tenure was his settlement with Western Union over wire transfers involving human smuggling. He cited this settlement often during the 2010 general election. One of his last acts as Arizona's attorney general was to cease negotiations with Bank of America over their foreclosure practices and sue them on behalf of injured Arizona consumers. This action was considered significant because Bank of America was still in negotiations with 48 other state attorneys general over the same issue. Nevada joined Arizona in the lawsuit, and succeeding Attorney General Tom Horne announced that he would continue it.

=== 2003–2004 ===
Goddard's first year as attorney general brought a lawsuit against Second Chance Body Armor, Inc. over alleged defects in the bulletproof vests used by Arizona police officers. The lawsuit alleged a violation of the Arizona Consumer Fraud Act.

There were several important court decisions during these years, including May vs Brewer, Arizona Libertarian Party v. Bayless, and movement in the Flores vs Arizona lawsuit regarding Structured English Immersion.

=== 2004–2005 ===
Qwest Communications long standing consumer fraud lawsuit over telephone slamming was finally settled in 2004 with a $3.75 million fine and $800,000 in consumer restitution. The years 2004–2005 also saw the start of Goddard's investigations into suspected polygamists and government abuse in the neighboring communities of Colorado City, Arizona. He agreed to coordinate a joint investigation with Utah Attorney General Mark Shurtleff. There was a string of 50 indictments against a Yuma, Arizona drug ring involving the U.S. Drug Enforcement Administration, the FBI, U.S. Border Patrol, Yuma County Attorney's Office, Yuma County Sheriff's Office and Arizona's Child Protective Services.

== Later political career ==
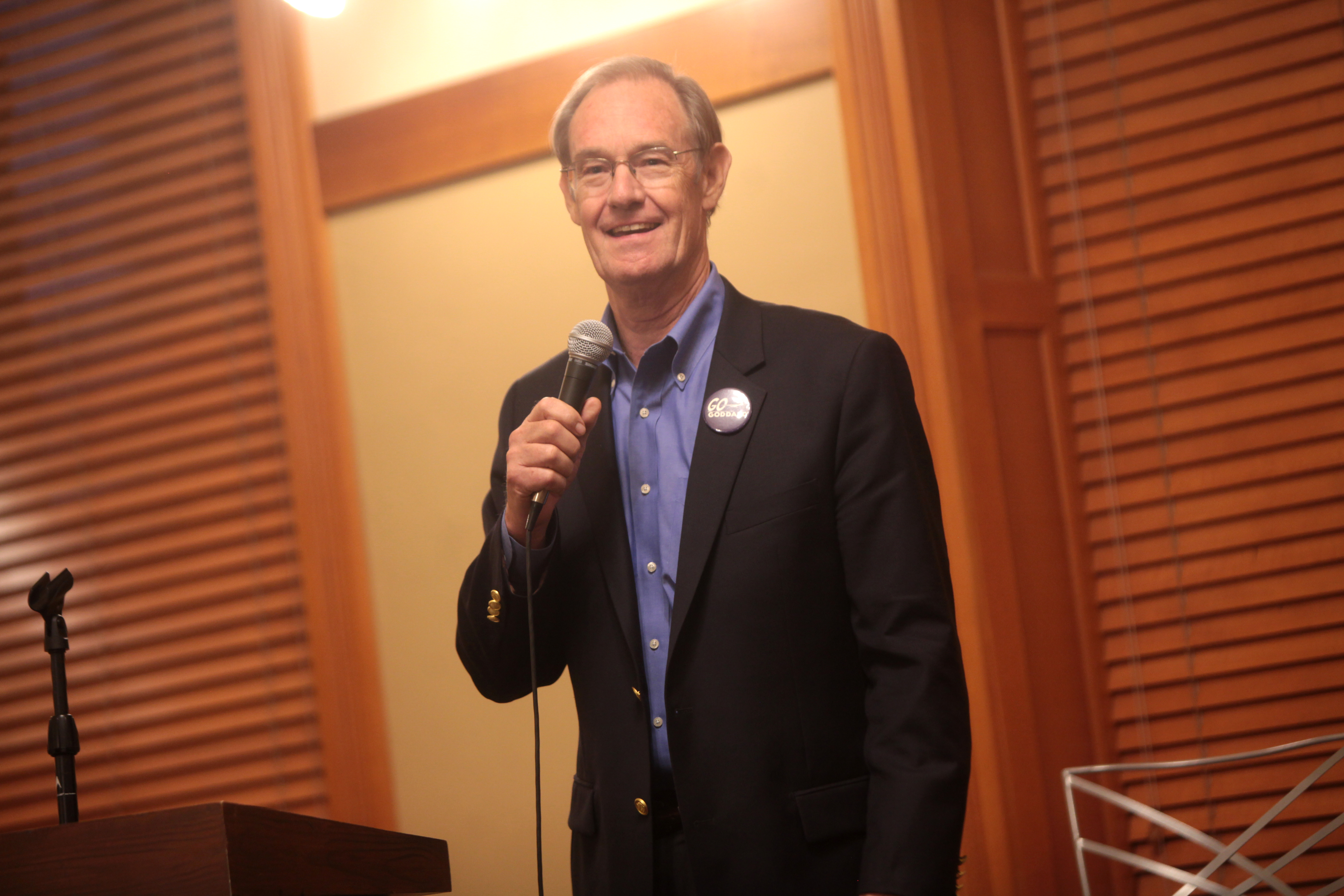
Goddard in 2014

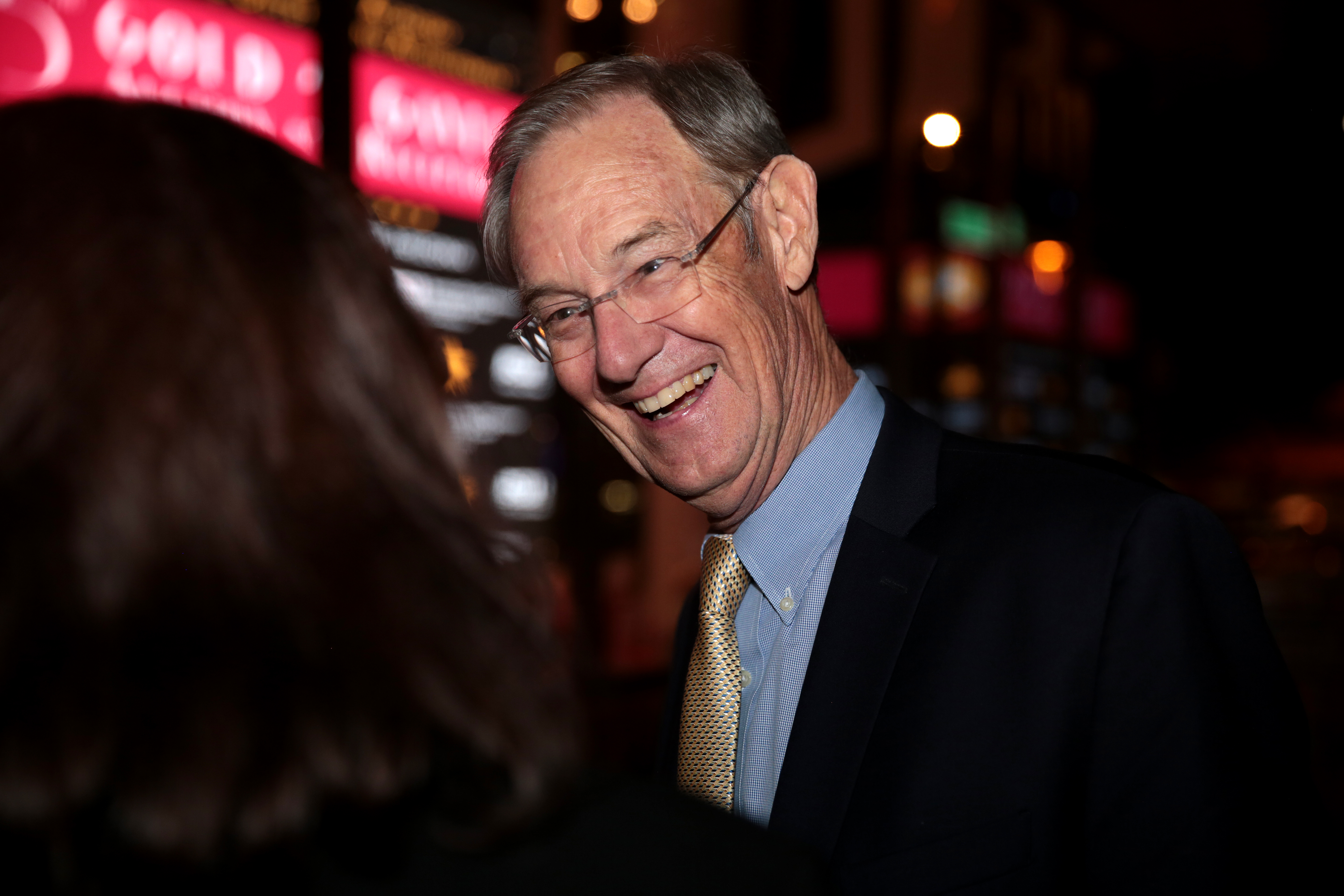
Goddard in 2017

=== 2010 gubernatorial campaign ===
In 2010, Goddard ran for Governor of Arizona, and was unopposed in the Democratic party primary, going on to challenge incumbent governor Jan Brewer in the general election. Earlier that year, in April 2010, Brewer had controversially signed into law Arizona SB 1070, which received national attention for its strict enforcement of immigration laws. Only one debate was held during the general election campaign. Goddard was unsuccessful in his attempt to defeat Brewer, losing by a nearly 12-point margin.

=== 2014 Secretary of State campaign ===
In 2014, Goddard ran for Secretary of State of Arizona, with the incumbent Republican secretary of state Ken Bennett not able to run for reelection due to term limits. Goddard was unopposed in the Democratic primary, and was challenged by Republican state senator Michele Reagan. Reagan defeated Goddard in the general election.

== See also ==
- 1990 Arizona gubernatorial election

Political offices
Preceded by Margaret Hance	Mayor of Phoenix; 1984–1990	Succeeded by Paul Johnson
Party political offices
Preceded by Carolyn Warner	Democratic nominee for Governor of Arizona; 1990	Succeeded by Eddie Basha
Preceded by Janet Napolitano	Democratic nominee for Governor of Arizona; 2010	Succeeded by Fred DuVal
Legal offices
Preceded by Janet Napolitano	Attorney General of Arizona; 2003–2011	Succeeded by Tom Horne
