= Richard Dupont =

American artist

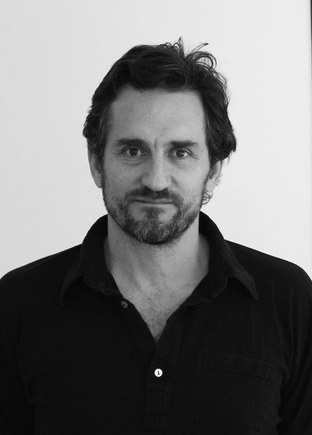
- Portrait of Dupont, c. 2013
- Born: Richard Simmons duPont Jr. October 5, 1968 (age 57); New York City, U.S.
- Education: Princeton University (AB)
- Occupation: Artist
- Known for: Contemporary Art
- Spouse: Lauren Martinez (m. 1997)
- Children: 3
- Relatives: Éleuthère Irénée du Pont (4x great-grandfather)
- Family: Du Pont family
- Website: Official website

Richard Dupont (born October 5, 1968) is an American artist and educator whose installations, sculptures, paintings and prints examine the social implications of 21st century digital technology. He has been a member of the faculty at School of Visual Arts since 2015.

== Early life and education ==
Dupont was born October 5, 1968 in New York City, to Richard Simmons duPont Sr., and Emily T. Frick (née Troth). He is a descendant of Éleuthère Irénée du Pont. His father was a pilot and aircraft commander who flew C-97s in the Vietnam War.

He received an AB degree from the Departments of Visual Art and Art and Archeology at Princeton University where he studied under the artist Merrill Wagner and the American Art history professor John Wilmerding. A 1990 conversation in his studio with visiting artist Roy Lichtenstein was a pivotal encounter with regard to Dupont's subsequent engagement with digital media.

== Work ==
A pioneer in the field of Digital Art, Dupont initially made paintings using scrambled digital signals as source material. In 2002 He began using scanners and 3D printing to capture and replicate distorted images of his body. Dupont had his whole body scanned at a General Dynamics facility on The Wright-Patterson Air Force Base in 2004. This scan resulted in a full-scale digital model of Dupont's body, which became the raw material for work in a range of media including sculpture, painting, printmaking and installation over the next two decades. Dupont's work examines the degree to which the primacy of the human gesture has been radically altered by the onset of digital technology. He also uses his art to interrogate expressions of power and control, and to examine how anthropometry, the Victorian science of mapping the body, has morphed over the past century into biometrics. One reason for the success of Dupont's work is his ability to collapse the divide between digital and analogue information. His works draw from digital sources, but emphasize an embodied experience, a physical and perceptual interaction between artwork and viewer. The work often transforms the virtual space of the screen into the lived physical space of the artwork. Beginning in 2020, Dupont's practice reengaged painting. Using images from memory, photography and AI, his work in two dimensions questions the relationship of digital media to painting, representation and the reliability of visual truth.

== Exhibitions and awards ==
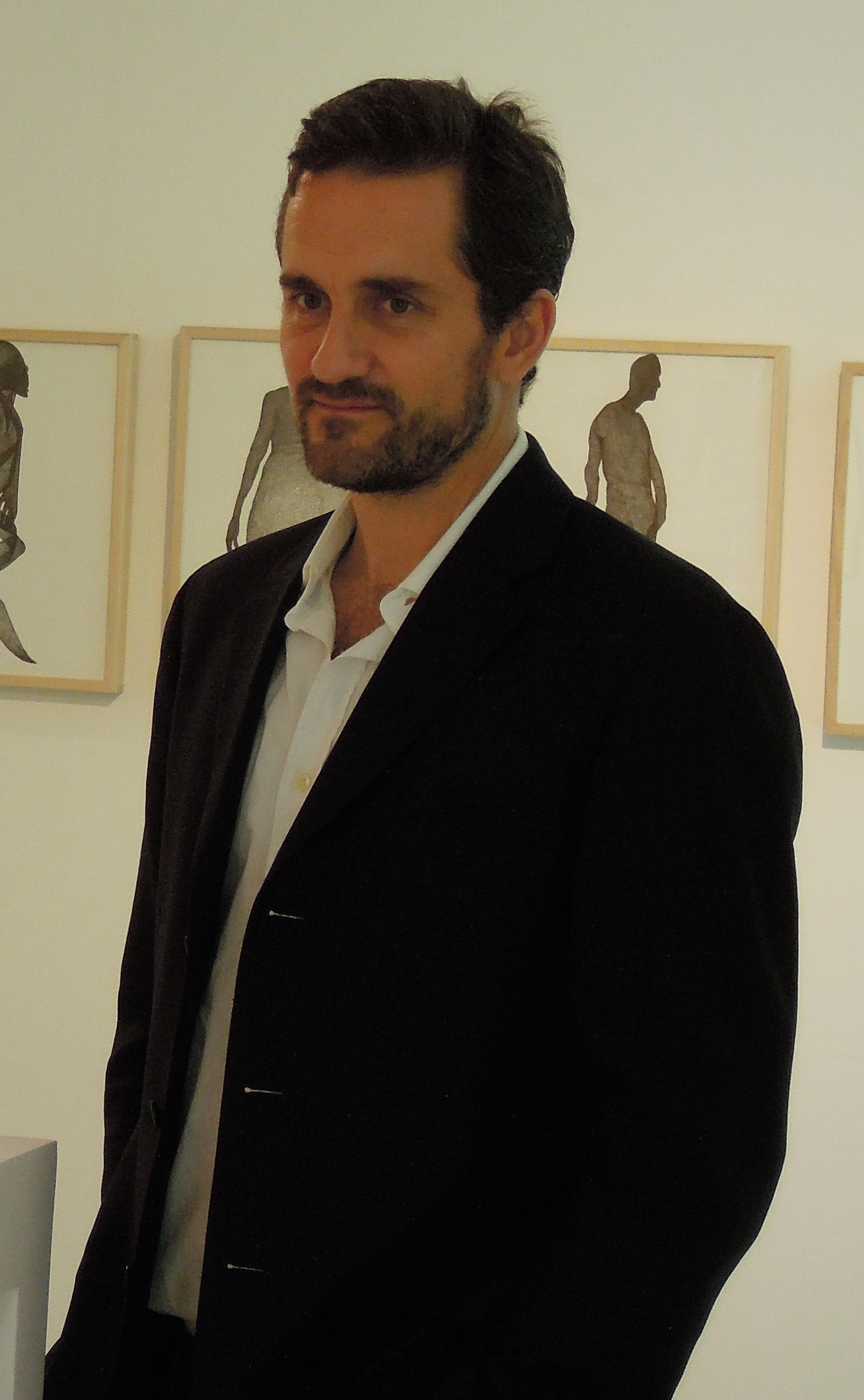
Dupont at an exhibition in New York City

In 2005, Dupont was invited to present a solo project at Art Basel Miami in the Art Positions sector. Also in 2005, Dupont exhibited at Tracy Williams Ltd. in New York, where he presented "Three in One (Self Anointed)" 2002-2004, a sculptural tableau consisting of three distorted life-size replicas of the artist's body rendered using a combination of digital fabrication and traditional casting. This work was acquired by The Museum of Modern Art that same year. In 2008, Dupont was commissioned by The Lever House Art Collection to present a major installation at Lever House. The installation was widely acclaimed. Between 2008 and 2016, Dupont's work was exhibited at The Middlebury College Museum of Art, The Flag Art Foundation, The Queens Museum, The Cleveland Museum of Art, The Museum of Contemporary Art San Diego, The Powerhouse Museum, and The Underground Museum, Los Angeles. In 2013- 2014, Dupont exhibited in "Out of Hand: Materializing the Postdigital" at the Museum of Arts and Design. The exhibition was the first in-depth survey dedicated to exploring the impact of computer-assisted methods of production on contemporary art, architecture, and design. In 2014, Dupont was awarded the Museum of Arts and Design Visionary Award. In 2015, Dupont presented a solo exhibition at Tracy Williams, Ltd. In reviewing the show, New York Times art critic Martha Schwendener noted how every era needs its representations of the human figure, and that Dupont's sculptures aptly demonstrate how scanning, surveillance and imaging technology shape our conceptions of humanity today. Between 2017 and 2024, Dupont's work was exhibited at The Flag Art Foundation, The Southampton Arts Center, Vito Schnabel Projects, Bitforms gallery, Museo Leonora Carrington and Carolina Nitsch Contemporary Art.

In 2024, Richard Dupont's work was included in Every Sound Is a Shape of Time: Selections from PAMM's Collection, curated by museum director Franklin Sirmans at the Pérez Art Museum Miami alongside the artworks by other sixteen artists from the institution's holdings.

== Collections ==
Dupont's works are included in the collections of The Museum of Modern Art, New York; The Whitney Museum of American Art, New York; Museum of Fine Arts, Boston, Massachusetts; Pérez Art Museum Miami, Florida; The Cleveland Museum of Art, Ohio; The Brooklyn Museum, New York; The Hammer Museum, California; The Museum of Contemporary Art San Diego, California; and the New York Public Library print collection. among others.

== Personal life ==
On July 27, 1997, Dupont married Lauren Martinez (born 1970), the daughter of Arthur C. Martinez, of Chicago, Illinois. They have two daughters and a son.
