= 1990–91 Arizona gubernatorial election =

- November 6, 1990 (first round); February 26, 1991 (runoff)
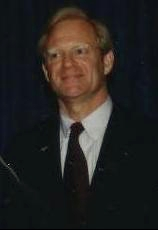

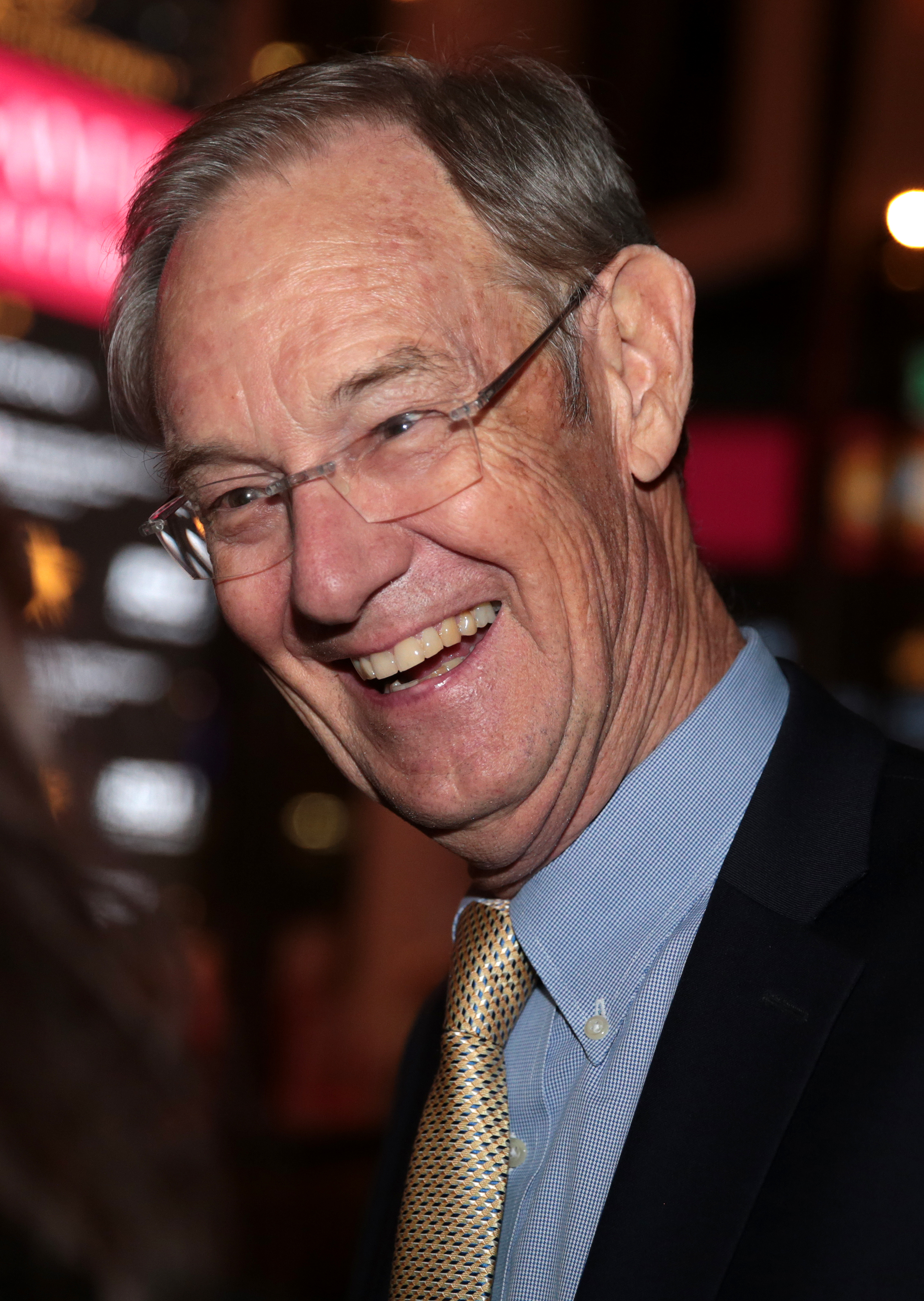
Candidate	Fife Symington	Terry Goddard
Party	Republican	Democratic
First round	523,984; 49.65%	519,691; 49.24%
Runoff	492,569; 52.36%	448,168; 47.64%
- Symington: 50–60% Goddard: 40–50% 50–60% 60–70% 70–80%
Governor before election
Rose Mofford
Democratic
Elected Governor
Fife Symington
Republican

The 1990–91 Arizona gubernatorial election took place on November 6, 1990, for the post of Governor of Arizona. Incumbent Democratic Governor Rose Mofford declined to run for a full term. Republican Fife Symington defeated the Democratic nominee and Mayor of Phoenix Terry Goddard. Because no candidate received a majority of votes, a runoff election was held later on February 26, 1991, which Symington also won. This is the only election where Arizona used a runoff election.

Evan Mecham, a former governor who was removed from office in 1988 upon being convicted in his impeachment trial, unsuccessfully ran for another term in the Republican primary.

== Democratic primary ==
=== Candidates ===
==== Declared ====
- Terry Goddard, mayor of Phoenix
- Dave Moss, perennial candidate

==== Declined ====
- Rose Mofford, incumbent governor

=== Results ===
Democratic primary results
Party	Candidate	Votes	%
Democratic	Terry Goddard	212,579	84.00%
Democratic	Dave Moss	40,478	16.00%
Total votes		253,057	100.00%

== Republican primary ==
=== Candidates ===
==== Declared ====
- Bob Barnes, former governor's aide
- Fred Koory, Jr, former State Senator
- Evan Mecham, former governor
- Sam Steiger, former U.S. Representative for Arizona
- Fife Symington, real estate developer

=== Results ===
Republican primary results
Party	Candidate	Votes	%
Republican	Fife Symington	163,010	43.78%
Republican	Evan Mecham	91,136	24.48%
Republican	Fred Koory, Jr	61,487	16.51%
Republican	Sam Steiger	49,019	13.17%
Republican	Bob Barnes	7,672	2.06%
Total votes		372,324	100.00%

== General election ==
=== Results ===
Arizona gubernatorial election, 1990
Party	Candidate	Votes	%	±%
Republican	Fife Symington	523,984	49.65%	+9.98%
Democratic	Terry Goddard	519,691	49.24%	+14.76%
Stop Abortion	Max Hawkins (write-in)	10,983	1.04%	+1.04%
Libertarian	Ed Yetman (write-in)	316	0.03%	+0.03%
Independent	Rick Lee Campbell (write-in)	163	0.02%	
Independent	Allen Weinstein (write-in)	76	0.01%	
Republican	Patrick P. Castronovo (write-in)	75	0.01%	
Independent	Robert P. Winn (write-in)	64	0.01%	
Independent	Peter J. Cojanis (write-in)	54	0.01%	
Majority		4,293	0.41%	
Total votes		1,055,406	100.00%	

=== Results by county ===
County	Fife Symington Republican		Terry Goddard Democratic		Max Hawkins Stop Abortion		Ed Yetman Libertarian		All others Write-in		Margin		Total votes cast
County	#	%	#	%	#	%	#	%	#	%	#	%	Total votes cast
Apache	3,638	27.49%	9,485	71.67%	91	0.69%	6	0.05%	14	0.11%	−5,847	−44.18%	13,234
Cochise	11,472	47.17%	12,685	52.16%	136	0.56%	13	0.05%	14	0.06%	−1,213	−4.99%	24,320
Coconino	11,330	39.72%	17,050	59.78%	123	0.43%	11	0.04%	8	0.03%	−5,720	−20.05%	28,522
Gila	6,283	43.88%	7,893	55.13%	128	0.89%	5	0.03%	8	0.06%	−1,610	−11.25%	14,317
Graham	3,614	48.47%	3,699	49.61%	141	1.89%	2	0.03%	0	0.00%	−85	−1.14%	7,456
Greenlee	1,071	36.70%	1,836	62.92%	11	0.38%	0	0.00%	0	0.00%	−765	−26.22%	2,918
La Paz	1,829	52.45%	1,622	46.52%	33	0.95%	1	0.03%	2	0.06%	207	5.94%	3,487
Maricopa	330,261	53.17%	282,409	45.46%	8,156	1.31%	139	0.02%	234	0.04%	47,852	7.70%	621,199
Mohave	14,068	51.33%	13,131	47.91%	154	0.56%	11	0.04%	41	0.15%	937	3.42%	27,405
Navajo	7,708	43.31%	9,867	55.44%	204	1.15%	9	0.05%	11	0.06%	−2,159	−12.13%	17,799
Pima	87,701	43.53%	112,572	55.87%	1,028	0.51%	94	0.05%	83	0.04%	−24,871	−12.34%	201,478
Pinal	11,762	41.13%	16,562	57.92%	257	0.90%	9	0.03%	7	0.02%	−4,800	−16.78%	28,597
Santa Cruz	2,140	35.93%	3,801	63.82%	10	0.17%	2	0.03%	3	0.05%	−1,661	−27.89%	5,956
Yavapai	22,682	55.69%	17,567	43.13%	467	1.15%	11	0.03%	4	0.01%	5,115	12.56%	40,731
Yuma	8,425	46.84%	9,512	52.88%	44	0.24%	3	0.02%	3	0.02%	−1,087	−6.04%	17,987
Totals	523,984	49.65%	519,691	49.24%	10,983	1.04%	316	0.03%	432	0.04%	4,293	0.41%	1,055,406

== Runoff election ==
Prior to 1992, the Arizona State Constitution required a runoff election for the office of governor if no candidate received a majority of the votes. As a result, a runoff election was held on February 26, 1991.

=== Results ===
Arizona gubernatorial runoff election, 1991
Party	Candidate	Votes	%
Republican	Fife Symington	492,569	52.36%
Democratic	Terry Goddard	448,168	47.64%
Majority		44,401	4.72%
Total votes		940,737	100.00%
Republican hold			

=== Results by county ===
Graham County voted Republican after voting Democratic in the first round.

County	Fife Symington Republican		Terry Goddard Democratic		Margin		Total votes cast
County	#	%	#	%	#	%	Total votes cast
Apache	2,982	26.45%	8,294	73.55%	−5,312	−47.11%	11,276
Cochise	9,862	48.08%	10,651	51.92%	−789	−3.85%	20,513
Coconino	9,444	41.88%	13,107	58.12%	−3,663	−16.24%	22,551
Gila	5,670	46.09%	6,632	53.91%	−962	−7.82%	12,302
Graham	3,512	56.07%	2,752	43.93%	760	12.13%	6,264
Greenlee	1,003	41.19%	1,432	58.81%	−429	−17.62%	2,435
La Paz	1,558	56.45%	1,202	43.55%	356	12.90%	2,760
Maricopa	315,811	55.95%	248,691	44.05%	67,120	11.89%	564,502
Mohave	13,106	55.00%	10,722	45.00%	2,384	10,01%	23,828
Navajo	7,081	44.81%	8,721	55.19%	−1,640	−10.38%	15,802
Pima	82,594	45.79%	97,773	54.21%	−15,179	−8.42%	180,367
Pinal	10,562	44.01%	13,435	55.99%	−2,873	−11.97%	23,997
Santa Cruz	1,741	44.79%	2,146	55.21%	−405	−10.42%	3,887
Yavapai	21,515	58.68%	15,148	41.32%	6,367	17.37%	36,663
Yuma	6,128	45.09%	7,462	54.91%	−1,334	−9.82%	13,590
Totals	492,569	52.36%	448,168	47.64%	44,4013	4.72%	940,737

==== Counties that flipped from Republican to Democratic ====
- Cochise
