= Jay Heiler =

American lawyer

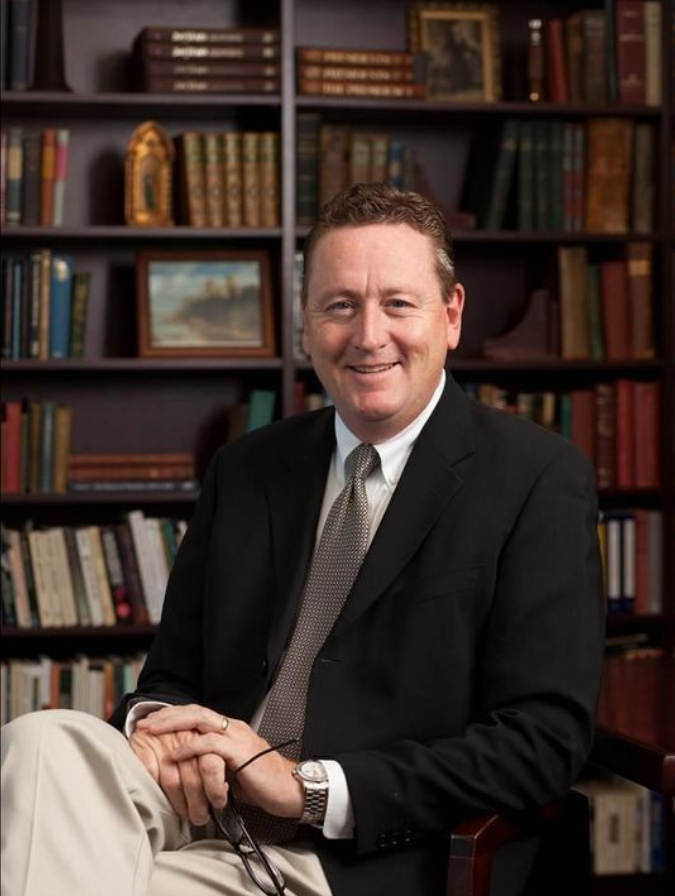

Board of Regents

Personal details
- Born: James Jay Heiler; June 11, 1960 (age 66) Sandusky, Ohio, U.S.
- Party: Republican
- Education: Arizona State University
- Profession: Education, Businessman, Public Affairs

Jay Helier (born June 11, 1960) is an American lawyer, political analyst, journalist, and businessman. Heiler currently serves as Treasurer of the Board of the Arizona Board of Regents and is a member of the Business and Finance Committee, Academic and Student Affairs Committee and the Regents Executive Committee. Heiler is also the co-founder and Board Chairman of Great Hearts Academies, a charter school network operating several K-12 campuses in Arizona and Texas. He also leads as the President of the Arizona Charter School Association.

== Biography ==
Heiler grew up in Clermont County, Ohio, on the outskirts of Cincinnati. He graduated from Arizona State University in 1983. While at ASU, he was a Pulliam Scholar, and editor-in-chief of The State Press, the campus daily newspaper. According to the Phoenix New Times, Heiler, along with future George W. Bush speechwriter Matthew Scully, "was one in a series of students who took over the paper and used its editorial pages to push their conservative bent-attacking liberal professors, homosexuals and others."

He then went to law school at ASU, graduating in 1986, and worked in the Arizona Attorney General's office from 1986 to 1989.

In 1989, Heiler moved to Virginia to become editorial page editor of the Richmond Times-Dispatch.

In 1992, Heiler returned to Arizona to work for then-governor Fife Symington, eventually becoming his chief of staff.

When Symington resigned in 1997 after being convicted of bank fraud, Heiler became a political and public-affairs consultant.

=== Great Hearts Academies ===
Helier co-founded Great Hearts Academies in 2004. Great Hearts is a K-12 charter school that operates 28 campuses across Arizona and Texas. Great Hearts began with a single school in 2004 but has grown steadily. Great Hearts' curriculum is based on the Great Books of the Western World and gives its students a diverse liberal arts education. In 2016, Great Hearts announced plans to add to its charter school network and will build a new $17 million campus in north Phoenix. In 2017, Great Hearts was awarded a $20 million in bond funding to support ongoing campus development.

=== Appointment to Arizona Board of Regents ===
In 2011, Arizona Governor Jan Brewer announced the appointment of Heiler to the Arizona Board of Regents (ABOR) citing his leadership and creativity as a co-founder of Great Hearts Academies. Heiler's term began in 2012 and expired in 2020.

=== 2018 Arizona Senate race ===
In October 2017, Heiler said he was considering running in the Arizona Republican primary for U.S. Senate against incumbent Jeff Flake after Flake's criticism of President Donald Trump. "'The president’s agenda is one which I wholeheartedly endorse,' Mr. Heiler said. 'I have not seen the president advance anything which I don’t think is in the best interest of the country.'"

== Controversies ==
=== Statements on Homosexuals ===
In 2012 during Heiler's confirmation to the Arizona Board of Regents, Democrats were troubled by statements Heiler had made in the past. In an editorial for The State Press at ASU, Heiler wrote:

It is my impression that by 'coming out of the closet,' as their emergence has come to be called, homosexuals hope to make the rest of us less uncomfortable about their aberration-and despite one's feelings about it, it is most definitely an aberration.

Supportive Republicans noted the comments were made many years ago and Heiler ought to be judged by his current position on gays. Heiler said that his position has changed and that all Arizonans "ought to live in harmony together."

=== Statements on Immigrants ===
During his time at The State Press at ASU, Heiler wrote editorials critical of immigrants to the United States maintaining their native language and cultures:

The immigrants come here to start a new life, then try to cling to their own language and customs. This tendency leads to all sorts of societal problems, ranging from interracial unrest to unexplained disappearances of dogs. The former difficulty crops up wherever aliens are to be found; the latter arose in California when the Vietnamese arrived.

Heiler has since stated that he has arrived at a "different set of policy judgements" with respect to "Dreamers." Heiler was a signatory to a letter to President Trump in December 2016 urging him to support DACA students. However, as a voting member of the Arizona Board of Regents, Heiler cast the only dissenting vote against providing in-state tuition for students protected under DACA.

=== Biological Sex and Gender Student Policy at Great Hearts Academies ===
As Board Chairman for Great Hearts Academies, a large charter school network based in Phoenix, Arizona, Heiler was part of the team that oversaw the passage of the "Biological Sex and Gender Policy" across all 25 Great Hearts campuses in Arizona and Texas affecting more than 10,000 students. The policy, which defines a person's gender identity by their biological sex, is seen by conservative groups as a plan that protects children. Transgender students and their parents argue that the policy is discriminatory.
