= Fife Symington =

American politician (born 1945)

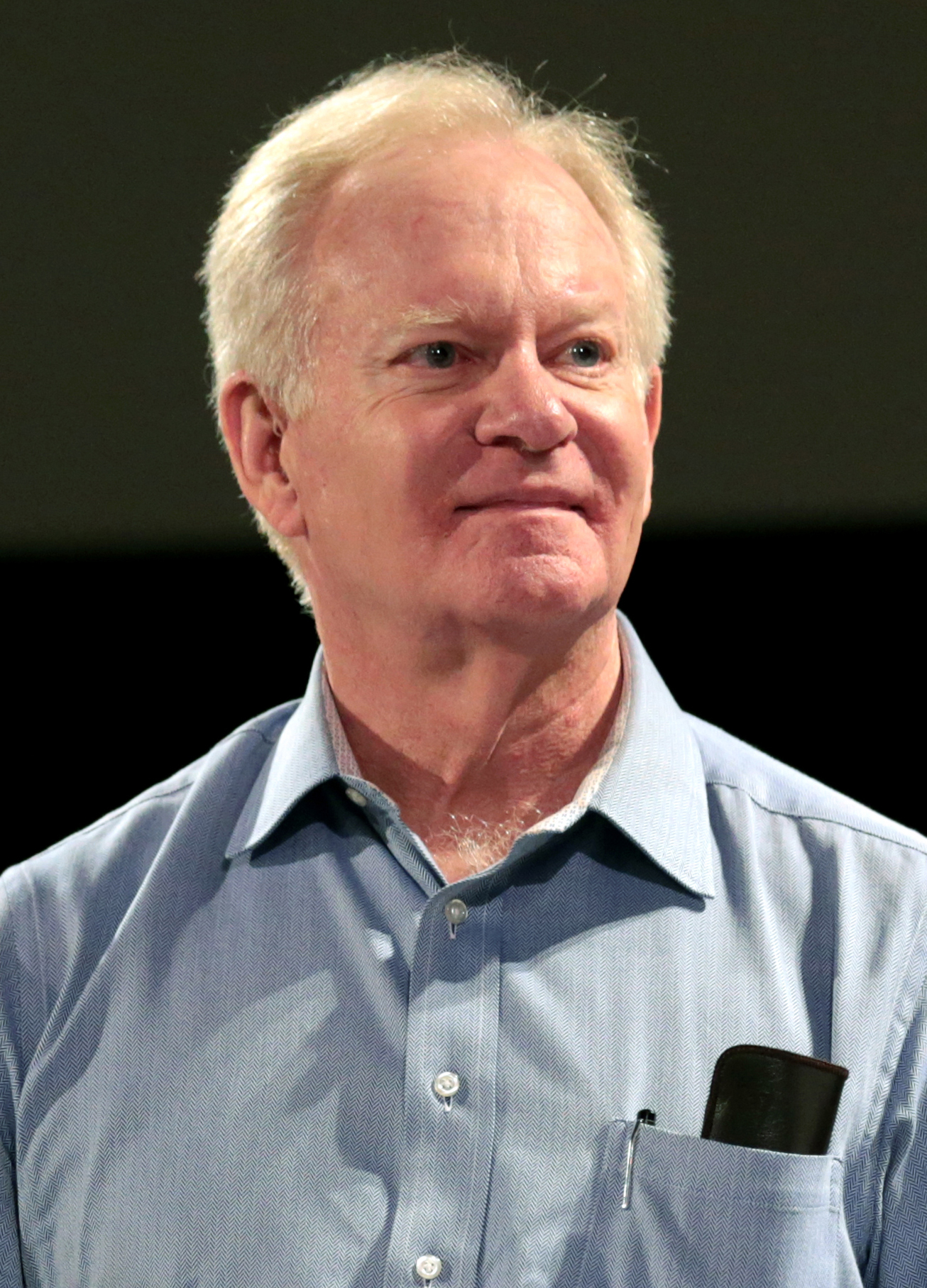
- Symington in 2017

19th Governor of Arizona
- In office March 6, 1991 – September 5, 1997
- Preceded by: Rose Mofford
- Succeeded by: Jane Dee Hull

Personal details
- Born: John Fife Symington III; August 12, 1945 (age 81) New York City, New York, U.S.
- Party: Republican
- Spouse: Ann Olin Pritzlaff (m. 1976)
- Relatives: J. Fife Symington Jr. (father); Stuart Symington (first cousin); Symington family
- Education: Harvard University (BA)

Military service
- Branch/service: United States Air Force
- Years of service: 1967–1971
- Rank: Captain
- Battles/wars: Vietnam War
- Awards: Bronze Star Medal

John Fife Symington III (born August 12, 1945) is an American businessman and politician who served as the 19th governor of Arizona from 1991 until his resignation in 1997 following convictions on charges of extortion and bank fraud, which were later overturned. A member of the Republican Party, Symington served in the United States Air Force and was stationed at Luke Air Force Base in Glendale, Arizona prior to entering politics. Linked to the Symington family, He is the son of J. Fife Symington Jr., the United States Ambassador to Trinidad and Tobago during the Nixon administration, the cousin of Stuart Symington, a United States Senator from Missouri, and the younger brother of Martha Frick Symington Sanger, an author.

A native of New York City, Symington attended the Gilman School in Baltimore; he subsequently graduated from Harvard University with a degree in Dutch art history. Symington comes from a political family: his father, J. Fife Symington Jr., served as Ambassador to Trinidad and Tobago; his cousin Stuart Symington was a U.S. Senator from Missouri. After joining the Air Force in 1967 and achieving the rank of captain, Symington was awarded the Bronze Star for meritorious service. He was honorably discharged in 1971. He remained in Arizona and became a real estate developer, founding his own company, the Symington Company, in 1976.

Symington was elected to the governorship in 1990 over Democratic Mayor of Phoenix Terry Goddard, following a close campaign that resulted in a runoff election. During his first term, Symington established charter schools in Arizona by signing sweeping education reform legislation, with the first charter schools opening in the state in 1995. The following year, during his second term, Symington signed legislation to establish the Arizona Water Bank Authority as a separate agency, allowing excess water to be acquired from the Central Arizona Project and banked in Arizona for future necessity. His term in office also oversaw the first temporary closure of Grand Canyon National Park during the federal government shutdown in November 1995. In 1997, Symington was convicted on seven counts of bank fraud, and resigned from office, but the convictions were later overturned. Before the government could retry him, Symington was pardoned in January 2001 by President Bill Clinton, whom he once saved from a rip tide off of Connecticut during his youth.

After his term as governor, Symington left public service and pursued a career as a chef, later co-founding the Arizona Culinary Institute with his business partners Jerry Moyes, Darren Leite and chef Robert E. Wilson. He has been speculated as a possible candidate for another term as Governor of Arizona, as well as considered running for the United States Senate, but has only endorsed candidates since leaving the Governor's office. Symington is also known as a witness to the infamous Phoenix Lights, a mass UFO sighting which occurred in Phoenix, Arizona on March 13, 1997.

== Early life and career ==
Symington was born in New York City, New York on August 12, 1945. Symington comes from a wealthy Maryland family; he is the great-grandson of steel magnate Henry Clay Frick. Symington was born to Martha Howard (née Frick), and J. Fife Symington Jr. who served as United States Ambassador to Trinidad and Tobago from 1969 to 1971 under President Richard Nixon. He is also a cousin to Stuart Symington, who was U.S. Senator from Missouri from 1953 to 1976.

He attended Gilman School in Baltimore, and then went to Harvard University, graduating in 1968 with a degree in Dutch art history. During his time at Gilman, Symington met Thomas Caplan, who would later introduce him to Bill Clinton during college. At 19 years old, Symington rescued an intoxicated 19-year-old Clinton from nearly drowning in a rip tide during a trip to Hyannis Port, Massachusetts near the Kennedy compound. While studying at Harvard, Symington discovered the works of Nobel Prize winner Friedrich Hayek, an economist, social theorist and political philosopher who promoted limited government and free markets. Hayek's work would serve as an influence for Symington's political beliefs in regards to fiscal and taxation policy as governor. Symington was also a supporter of Barry Goldwater in the 1964 presidential election against Lyndon B. Johnson. Beginning in 1967, he served in the United States Air Force during the Vietnam War, and was stationed at Luke Air Force Base near Glendale, Arizona. In 1971, he was awarded the Bronze Star for meritorious service, before being honorably discharged. He remained in Arizona and became involved in real estate development, founding his own company, The Symington Company, in 1976. In 1983, he was appointed to Southwest Savings and Loan Association board of directors which was based in Salt Lake City, Utah.

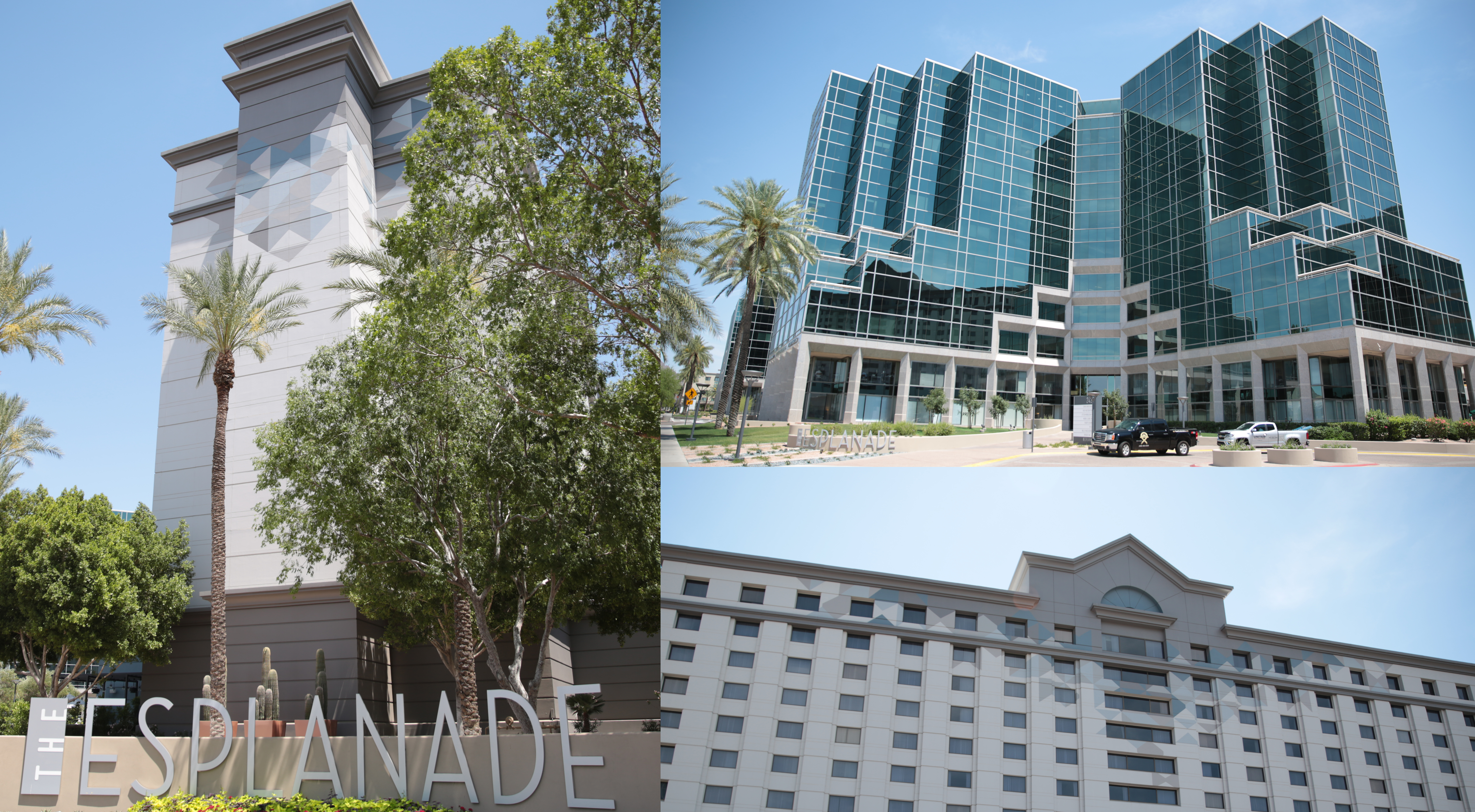
The Esplanade on Camelback and 24th Street in Phoenix was one of The Symington Company's development projects.

Beginning in 1983, one of Symington's projects as a real estate developer, with The Symington Company, was the construction of the Esplanade on 24th Street and Camelback Road, an up-scale office complex that had been built on a former Christmas tree lot. Symington believed it to be the "best location in town for business," and as of 2007, still had his own office on the fourth floor of the building. The financing of the project would later play a part in an investigation in his involvement with Southwest Savings and Loan, which provided the funds with Symington on its board of directors. Symington has stated that the approval of the construction of the Esplanade was significant because nothing over four stories had ever been granted along Camelback Road. The Esplanade took two decades to finish construction, with construction beginning in 1983, and completing in 2003.

Other development projects launched by The Symington Company include the Scottsdale Seville, as well as the Mercado, a shopping complex near downtown Phoenix whose design was influenced by southwestern and Hispanic culture. The Mercado was a concept that originated from Phoenix City Hall, which granted the first ever federal Urban Development Action Grant in Phoenix for the complex, and also owned the land that the Mercado was built upon. The Mercado opened in 1989, but it began facing financial hardships only a few years after its opening. Additionally, in an attempt to finance the construction of the Mercado, Symington repeatedly filed false financial statements, according to a jury in the case that later led to his resignation as governor, to receive a $10 million loan for the project from a group of Arizona pension funds. It was also alleged that Symington threatened to end the lease granted to Arizona State University, the largest tenant at the Mercado at the time, several times between July and October 1991, unless he was released from the $10 million loan. The Mercado loan officially went into default in 1992, with Symington filing for bankruptcy protection from creditors in U.S. Bankruptcy Court.

== Governor of Arizona (1991-1997) ==
=== 1990 gubernatorial campaign ===
In April 1989, Symington announced his bid for Governor of Arizona in the 1990 election, promising to run the state like a business. Beginning with the initial stages of his campaign, Symington had placed his business expertise and his success as a real estate developer center stage, stating, "What Arizona needs right now is a business mind. The state needs a man who can provide experienced, professional fiscal management to pull it out of its economic crisis. I am that man." In the Republican primary held on September 11, 1990, Symington was opposed by several high-profile career politicians, including former governor Evan Mecham, who had been impeached in 1988 and was attempting to make a comeback. Former U.S. Congressman Sam Steiger, who had previously run for U.S. Senate as the Republican nominee in 1976 and for Governor as the Libertarian nominee in 1982 also ran against Symington, but placed a distant fourth behind Mecham and State Senator Fred Koory. Despite being portrayed as a liberal by his primary opponents, Symington received nearly 44% of the vote in the primary.

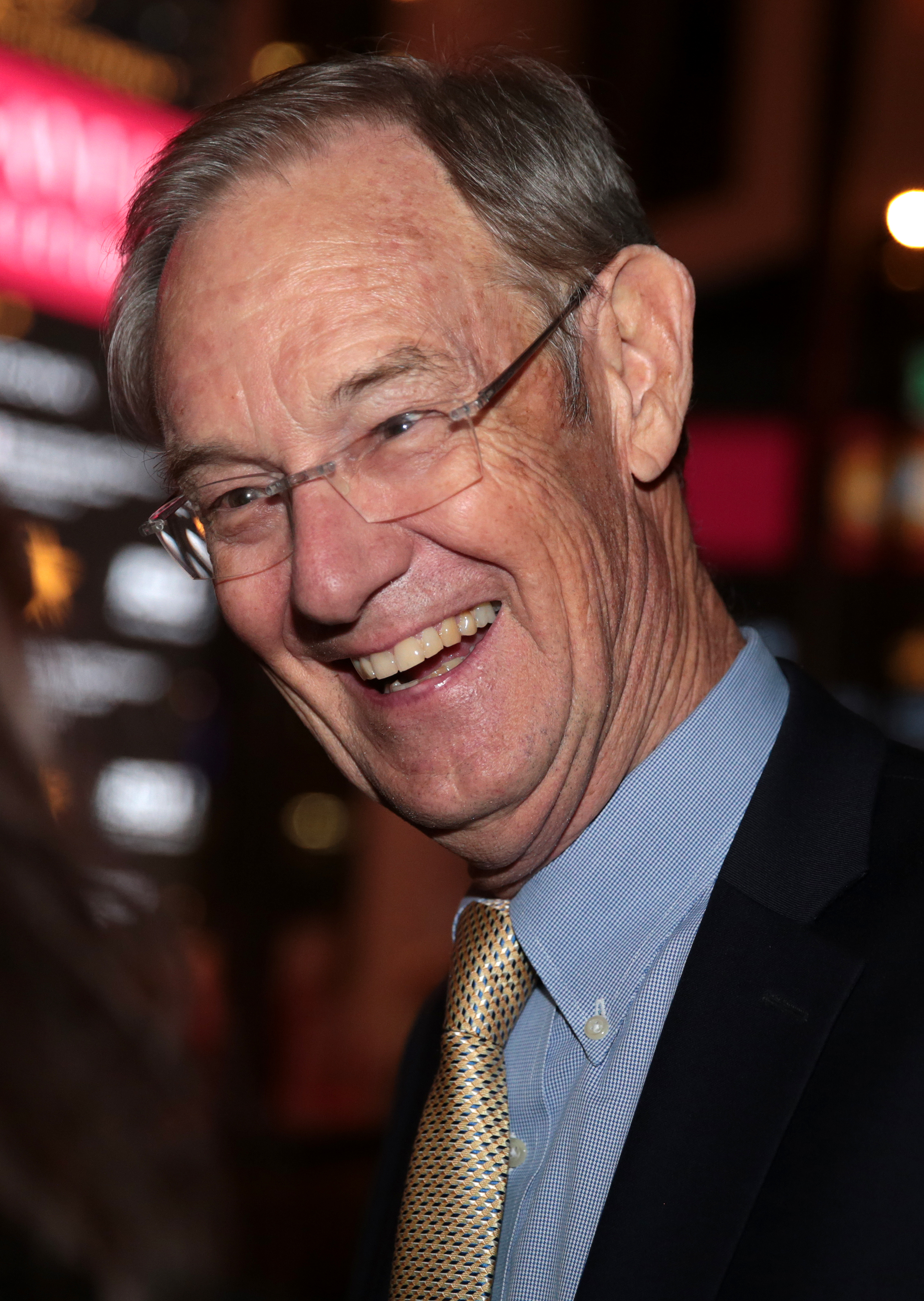
Former Phoenix Mayor Terry Goddard was nominated by the Democratic Party to challenge Symington in the 1990 election.

In his election night speech, Symington immediately began his general election campaign message by stating that his Democratic opponent, Terry Goddard, was "a professional politician, a tax-and-spend Dukakis liberal Democrat," and, in contrast, that he was a Barry Goldwater conservative, and "proud of it." At the time, Goldwater was seen as the ideological godfather of the modern Republican Party, and had endorsed Symington's campaign. Symington's father was also personal friends with Goldwater.

In the general election, the Democratic Party nominee was Terry Goddard, who had served as the mayor of Phoenix until February of that year. Goddard is also the son of former Arizona Governor Samuel Pearson Goddard Jr. During the campaign, Goddard had attempted to cast doubt on Symington in the minds of voters by stating that the former businessman could face indictment for his business activities. In response, Symington charged that Goddard had violated the state's campaign finance law by "accepting a law-firm salary while campaigning, without spending the stipulated hours on legal work." One of Symington's campaign promises included a state budget cut of 6%, except for programs related to education and the poor. On election day in November 1990, the presence of several write-in candidates resulted in Symington and Goddard being virtually tied, with Symington ahead by only 4,300 votes. Prior to the election, Arizona had adopted runoff voting in general elections if no candidate received more than 50% of the vote. This came after the controversial Evan Mecham had been elected governor in 1986 with only 40% of the vote. As a result, a runoff was scheduled for February 26, 1991. Both candidates spent a cumulative total of approximately $5 million in the primary, general and runoff campaigns.

Shortly before the runoff occurred, while in Washington, D.C. for a fundraiser, Symington was called before the U.S. Senate Judiciary Committee by Democratic Senator Howard Metzenbaum, a move that was seen as politically motivated. During the hearing, U.S. Senator Bob Dole accused the Democrats of a political "sneak attack" on Symington, a line which was later used in a Symington campaign commercial. The commercial also depicted Goddard behind bars, as the ad's narrator asks: "How can anyone trust Terry Goddard, when the fact is he's broken the law?" Symington would go on to win the runoff with 52% of the vote. After the extended campaign, Arizona returned to plurality voting for all subsequent gubernatorial elections, making the 1990 gubernatorial election the only statewide runoff election in Arizona's history.

=== First term (1991–1995) ===
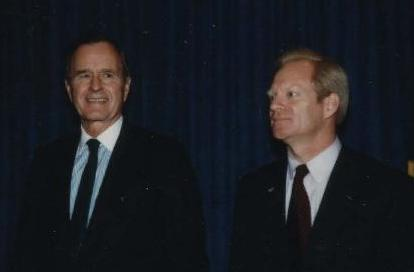
Symington with then-U.S. President George H. W. Bush at a fundraiser at the Madison Hotel in Phoenix in February 1991.

Symington was sworn into office on March 6, 1991, becoming Arizona's fourth governor in five years. Symington's first budget as governor, which totaled more than $3.5 billion, was successfully passed through the state legislature, earning him "high marks" from political analysts at the time, due to its lack of tax increases, as well as for its halting of an incineration project. The project had caused controversy due to the amount of hazardous waste that was being created. Symington also established an extensive review of its human resources management, and created the State Long-Term improved Management Project (known as Project SLIM). The goal of the project was to reduce the size of the state government and decrease spending. Recommendations that were made as a result of the project included methods for improving the hiring process, improving training, providing alternative processes for employee appeals, reducing overall employment, and upgrading the classification, pay, and benefits system, among other suggestions.

Symington's accounting firm had won the consulting contract for Project SLIM, which later led to an investigation, and resulted in a $3.3 million settlement due to inquiries into the bidding by other state and federal investigative agencies. Governor Symington, and other former directors of Southwest Savings and Loan, were also the subject of an investigation over their involvement in the failure of the Phoenix-based thrift, with the case later being settled for $12 million.

In November 1992, Symington ended a six-month standoff with the Fort McDowell Yavapai Nation by signing a compact that allowed the tribe to operate 250 video gambling machines. Prior to this, the tribe was acting in defiance of federal agents who had seized their gambling machines the year before the agreement. The Fort McDowell Yavapai Nation settled for a quarter of the machines that had been seized, and also agreed to allow state supervision of the gambling operation. In return, the state conceded to allowing the operation of a 24-hour bingo hall and casino by the tribe. Former Arizona Attorney General Jack LaSota criticized the decision at the time, due to Arizona's state laws against gambling. Symington later signed legislation in 1993 that reversed this decision, however, outlawing gambling and casinos, including for fundraising purposes for churches and charities. Also in November 1992, Symington was a supporter of a ballot proposal that reinstated Martin Luther King Jr. Day as a federal holiday in Arizona. The day had been removed as a federal holiday several years prior, under the administration of Governor Evan Mecham, who disagreed with its manner of implementation. Symington boasted that Arizona had become "the only state in the union to put it to the people," and felt the vote in approval of the holiday made "a wonderful statement about Arizona."

One of the major achievements enacted by Symington as Governor came at the end of his first term. It included sweeping education reform legislation, which led to the establishment of charter schools in Arizona. The goal behind establishing charter schools was to improve student achievement and provide additional academic choices, with the first charters opening the following year in 1995. Symington later remarked that by creating charter schools "the public education institutions would be forced to compete and get better, it was never meant to hurt, it was meant to make them better."

=== 1994 gubernatorial campaign ===
Symington ran for reelection to a second term in 1994. In the Republican primary, Symington was challenged by Barbara Barrett, wife of business executive Craig Barrett. In regard to his primary campaign message, Symington stated "I vowed to get state spending under control, reduce taxes and do my best to promote economic development and restore strength to the economy. I think I am in a strong position because I accomplished my goals." Barrett had spent more than $1 million of her own money in the attempt to defeat Symington, who she stated she did not dislike personally, but simply felt that she could do a better job as governor. On September 13, 1994, Symington defeated Barrett in the primary by a margin of 68% to 32%. Political analysts stated that Barrett had failed to distinguish herself from the incumbent governor, and ran a flawed campaign.

In the general election, Symington was challenged by Democratic nominee Eddie Basha, who was known in the state as a grocery store magnate as CEO and Chairman of Bashas'. Prior to the general election, Basha had led Symington in opinion polls by 15 to 20 points. However, the midterm elections of 1994 were a landslide for Republicans, which likely benefited Symington as well, despite his vulnerability due to the controversies that had emerged during his first term in office. Symington defeated Basha, winning 52% of the vote to Basha's 44%. Basha had refused to resort to negative campaigning until the final days of the campaign when it was likely too late, which political analysts pointed to as the reason for his loss. In addition, Symington had highlighted Basha's statement during a debate hosted by the League of Women Voters that the public school system "can be the surrogate family to help children and parents," which led Symington to declare that Basha believed the "state can take the place of the family." After defeating Basha, Symington, in his election night victory speech, pledged to try to further reduce state income taxes during the course of his second term, as well as continue to eliminate regulatory burden on businesses, and also to "get tough on crime." Symington also declared his upset victory a "miracle" and a "revolution," saying the people "want their country back and they want their taxes lowered. Barry Goldwater and Ronald Reagan started all this and God bless them."

=== Second term, conviction, and resignation (1995–1997) ===
Shortly into his second term in office as governor, Symington filed for personal bankruptcy, claiming debts of more than $24 million, caused by the collapse of his real estate investments. According to a report in The New York Times, Symington stated that his "hand was forced by a consortium of union pension funds that refused to negotiate a settlement of an $11 million debt." To finance the construction of a shopping center and office complex in downtown Phoenix, known as the Mercado, Symington had been lent $10 million from six union pension funds. They foreclosed in 1991 when the Mercado's disappointing revenue prevented Symington from being able to make payments towards the loan. This led to the court awarding the union pension funds an estimated $11.4 million settlement, which Symington stated was "beyond his ability to pay."

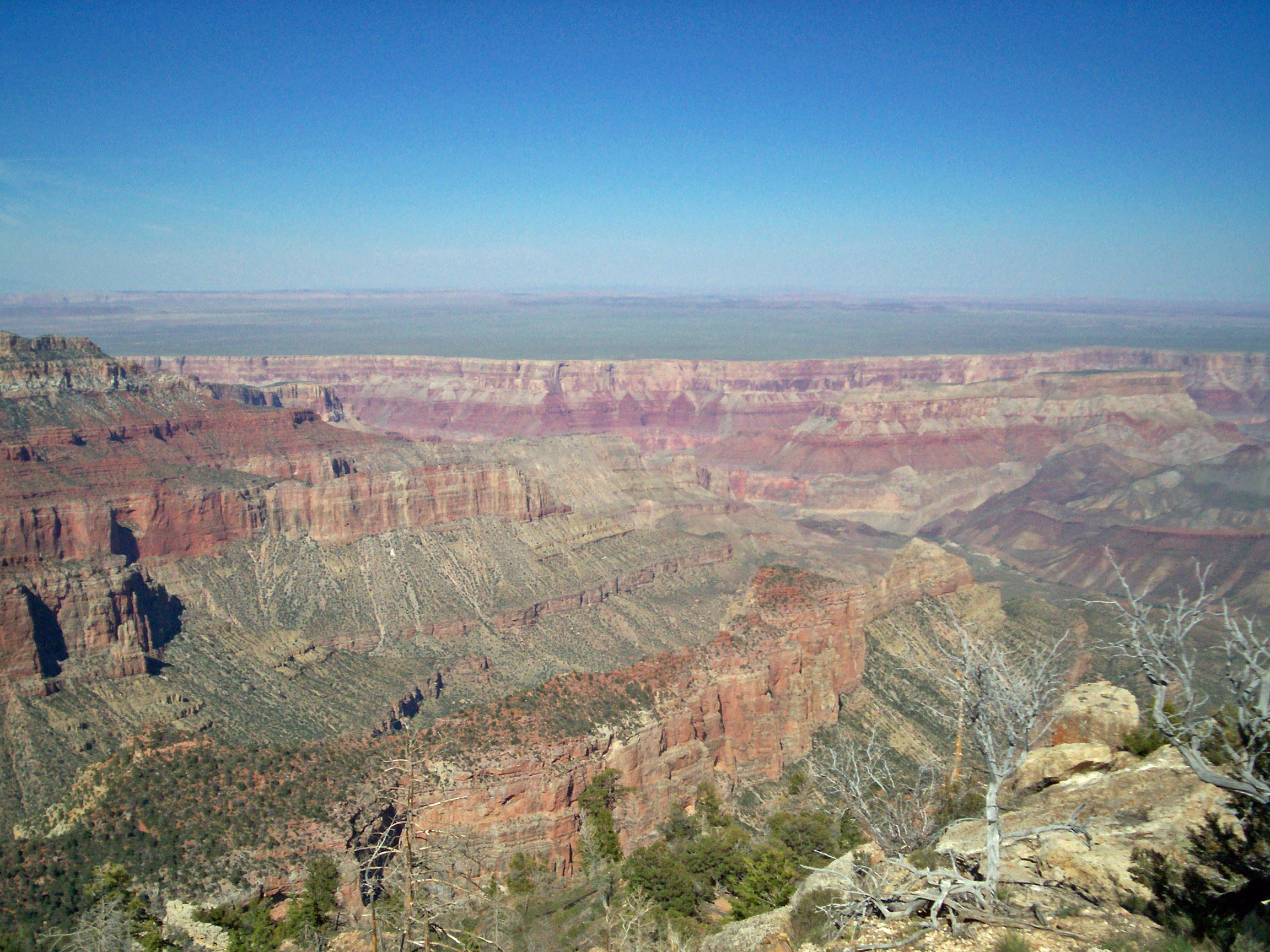
Symington oversaw the first temporary closure of Grand Canyon National Park following the federal government shutdown in November 1995.

In November 1995, Grand Canyon National Park was closed for the first time in its history, due to the federal government shutdown. On November 17, Symington's response came very close to creating a national crisis. Citing the dire effects of the park's closure on tourism, Symington stated that the "Grand Canyon must remain open, by force, if necessary." The Pentagon warned the head of the Arizona National Guard against the use of force and raised the possibility that, if necessary, the guard would be federalized and brought under the control of the White House. The governor decided to go ahead and, accompanied by the Speaker of the House Newt Gingrich, fifty unarmed National Guard troops, twenty-five state Park Department employees, and other officials, traveled to the canyon. When Symington's group arrived, Symington beat on the park gates in front of the media and demanded that the park be reopened.

Robert Arnberger, the park's superintendent delivered a letter to Symington from the United States Department of Interior which stated that the state of Arizona may be able to donate money to the department to reopen the Grand Canyon, which Symington called a "political game." The Department of Interior later reopened the park under state supervision. A federal agency reimbursed Arizona the $370,020 the state donated to keep the Grand Canyon National Park open during the shutdown. The government shut down again in mid-December of that year, but the state and the federal government were able to come to an agreement to keep the park partially open, with the state of Arizona paying $17,625 in advance of each day's operation, which was also later reimbursed by the federal government.

In 1996, Symington signed legislation establishing the Arizona Water Bank Authority as a separate agency. The agency acquires excess water from the Central Arizona Project and banks it in Arizona. In a news report published by The Arizona Republic in July 2016, historian Jack August wrote that the legislation "left Arizona in a better position to deal with the current drought than neighboring California," which was experiencing challenges with drought and water management at the time of the article's publication.

Later that same year, in June 1996, Symington was indicted on 21 federal counts of extortion, making false financial statements, and bank fraud. He was convicted for seven counts of bank fraud on September 4, 1997. He was charged with defrauding his lenders as a commercial real estate developer, extorting a pension fund and perjuring himself in a bankruptcy hearing. As Arizona, like most states, does not allow convicted felons to hold office, Symington resigned from office the next day. He was succeeded by then-Secretary of State Jane Dee Hull. Prior to his resignation, there had been a high-profile recall effort led by former Arizona Secretary of State Richard D. Mahoney. This conviction, however, was overturned in 1999 by the Ninth Circuit Court of Appeals. Six days into jury deliberations, the trial judge had granted the government's motion to dismiss a juror because the other jurors complained she was refusing to deliberate with them, a serious breach of the juror's oath. A three-judge panel of the appeals court ruled 2–1 that there was a "reasonable possibility" that the juror had actually been removed because she was leaning toward acquittal, and the rest of the jury was frustrated at the prospect of a hung jury (in federal cases, verdicts must be unanimous). The appeals court held that the juror's dismissal violated Symington's right to a fair trial, since he was entitled to that juror's vote. Before the government could retry him, Symington was pardoned in January 2001 by President Bill Clinton, terminating the federal government's seven-year battle with the former governor.

== Post-governorship ==
=== Arizona Culinary Institute ===
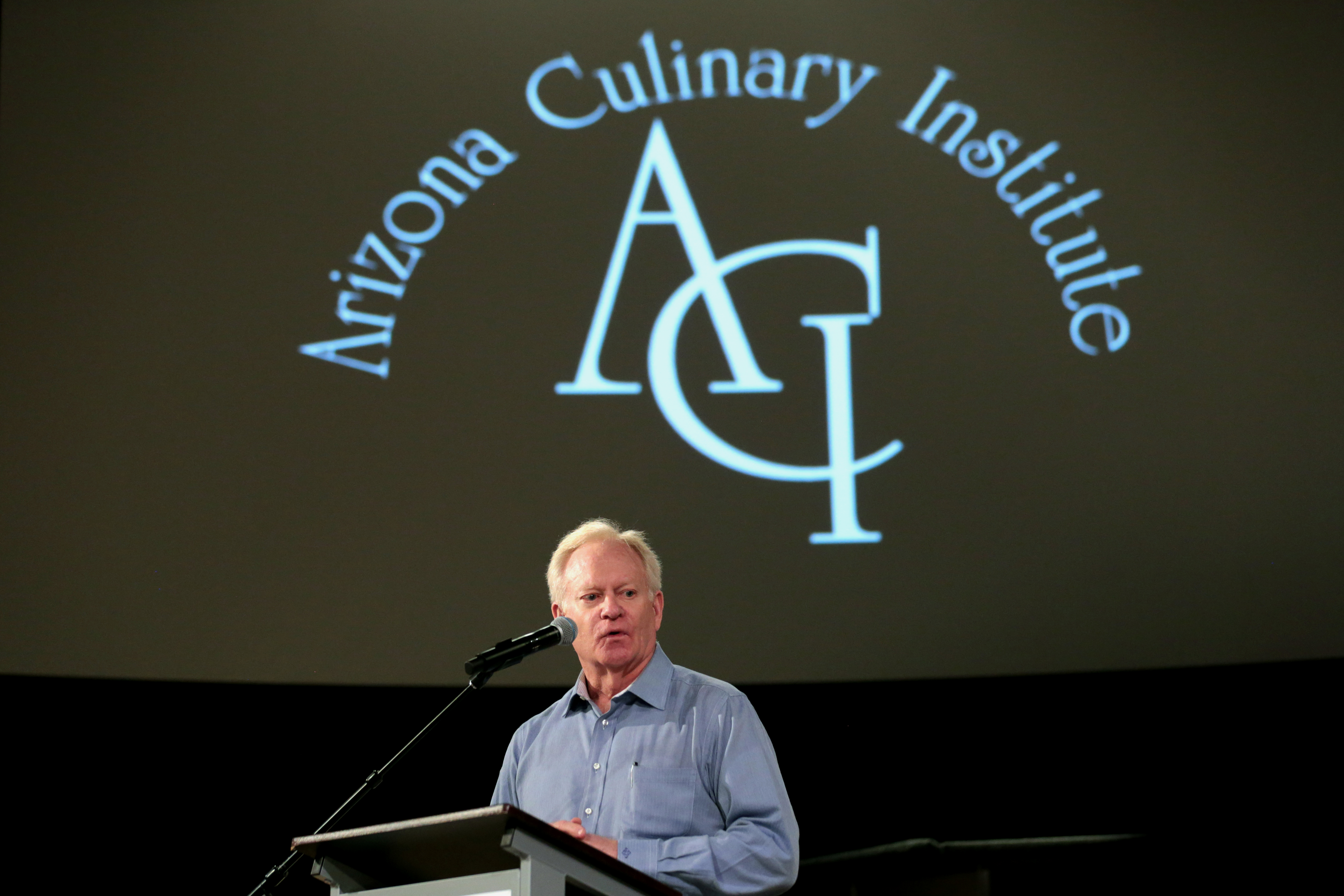
Symington speaking at a graduation ceremony for the Arizona Culinary Institute in June 2017.

While free on appeal, and before receiving a presidential pardon, Symington had attempted to reinvent himself as a private citizen and decided to enroll himself in culinary school. Symington stated of his experience that "It was very educational and very humbling." During his enrollment at the school, Symington had packed a bag of his belongings in case he had to report to Nellis Federal Prison in Las Vegas, Nevada, on 24 hours notice, but this was made moot following his pardon from President Clinton. After graduating from the Le Cordon Bleu College of Culinary Arts Scottsdale, Symington helped to found the Arizona Culinary Institute. The school was co-founded with several other business partners including chef Robert E. Wilson, entrepreneur Jerry Moyes and former president of the Scottsdale Culinary Institute Darren Leite. The vision of the school was to create a small class environment with hands on training, with a specific focus on the traditional French methods of cooking. The school was opened and started its first classes in early 2002 in Scottsdale.

In addition to his time as a student at culinary school, Symington returned to the Esplanade, a real estate development project that he started in 1983 and eventually lost in the investigation of his business practices, and began working as a dessert and pastry chef at an Italian restaurant at the facility. Symington opened the restaurant, called Franco's Italian Caffe, in February 2003 with a business partner, restaurateur Franco Fazzuoli. Symington had previously interned at a restaurant that Fazzuoli owned while attending culinary school.

During an interview with The Washington Post, Symington disclosed that he would rather be a chef than be "making money," and that it was a "great experience." Symington's specialties included tiramisu, as well as a chocolate mousse recipe he created called "The Governor (high taste, low taxes)." Then-Governor Janet Napolitano had supposedly visited Franco's Italian Caffe and finished her meal with "The Governor" dessert on multiple occasions, which was reported by the Tucson Citizen to be the best-selling dessert at the restaurant. The recipe for "The Governor" included "a layer of dense, flourless chocolate cake made with Callebaut dark chocolate from Belgium," and "topped with chocolate mousse, then with another Callebaut chocolate cake with another layer of mousse." Finally, the entire dessert is "drizzled with a chocolate ganache."

=== Phoenix Lights ===
In 2007, Symington revealed he was a witness to the Phoenix Lights, the mass UFO sighting that took place on March 13, 1997, when he was governor of Arizona, a decade before this admission. In an interview with The Daily Courier, Symington stated, "I'm a pilot and I know just about every machine that flies. It was bigger than anything that I've ever seen. It remains a great mystery. Other people saw it, responsible people. I don't know why people would ridicule it." He continued, "It was enormous and inexplicable. Who knows where it came from? A lot of people saw it, and I saw it too. It was dramatic. And it couldn't have been flares because it was too symmetrical. It had a geometric outline, a constant shape." As Governor during the Phoenix Lights, Symington stated he would investigate the event, but went on to hold a press conference where he had his chief of staff dress up in an alien costume. He later stated that as a public official he had felt a responsibility to avert public panic and therefore made an attempt to introduce some levity into the situation.

On November 9, 2007, he appeared with a panel of guests discussing their UFO experiences on Larry King Live. A few days later, on November 12, Symington acted as moderator for a UFO press conference at the National Press Club in Washington, D.C. Other speakers included U.S. and foreign military witnesses and public officials involved in some major UFO cases, such as the 1980 Rendlesham Forest incident, 1990 Belgium UFO incident, and 1976 Tehran UFO incident, and heads of some official foreign government UFO investigations, such as Nick Pope in the United Kingdom and Claude Poher of France. They said the phenomenon was quite real, should be taken seriously, and urged the U.S. government to reopen its public UFO investigations. Symington also appeared as a witness of the Phoenix Lights in an updated version of the 2002 UFO documentary Out of the Blue by filmmaker James Fox. Prior to the documentary, Fox helped organize the witness panels for both Larry King Live, and the subsequent National Press Club event.

In 2017, Symington also wrote an editorial piece for CNN, where he further described his experience in witnessing the Phoenix Lights, saying that he observed a delta-shaped craft, which moved silently across the sky over Piestewa Peak (formerly known as Squaw Peak). He further described it as "dramatically large" with a "very distinctive leading edge with some enormous lights." He also expressed his dissatisfaction with the Air Force's explanation of the event as test flares, while acknowledging that there was a possibility of flares also being ignited that night, but that the Phoenix Lights were completely separate from those tests. He went on to voice his support for opening up further investigations, saying "Investigations need to be re-opened, documents need to be unsealed and the idea of an open dialogue can no longer be shunned," and calling for the government to cease "putting out stories that perpetuate the myth that all UFOs can be explained away in down-to-earth conventional terms."

=== Potential return to politics and endorsements ===
On February 4, 2005, in an interview with The Arizona Republic, Symington expressed interest in running again for governor in 2006 against Democrat Janet Napolitano. His interest in the race came after he attended Napolitano's State of the State Address in 2005, and was galvanized in opposition to Napolitano's education platform. However, three months later, on May 5, he withdrew his name from consideration, saying that he wanted to focus his energy on The Symington Group instead. In November 2006, Symington lost a bid to become the Republican Party Chairman of his local legislative district, the district also happened to be the home district of Senator John McCain, whose support Symington had received. This was the first electoral defeat of Symington's career. In April 2007, Symington was named chairman of the board of trustees of the Santa Barbara Botanic Garden.

Following Janet Napolitano's resignation as Governor of Arizona in 2009, due to her appointment as Secretary of Homeland Security, Symington was once more considered as a potential candidate to run in the 2010 gubernatorial election, but he again refused to run, announcing the decision in October 2009 following disappointing hypothetical poll numbers. Symington instead endorsed former Arizona Republican Party chairman John Munger, against incumbent governor Jan Brewer, but Munger eventually dropped out of the race when he was unable to compete with his fellow candidates' sizable fundraising and public funding of their campaigns. Despite Symington's refusal to run again for public office, he has remained involved in state politics, endorsing candidates from both major parties, including Doug Ducey for governor, John McCain for U.S. Senate, and Democrats Ruben Gallego for U.S. Congress and Felecia Rotellini for Arizona Attorney General, among others.

Following the announcement by U.S. Senator Jeff Flake that he would not be seeking reelection to a second term, in October 2017, Symington became the treasurer of board of regents member Jay Heiler's U.S. Senate exploratory committee, alongside former governor Jan Brewer as chairman. Heiler was Symington's Chief of Staff during his two terms as governor. In January 2018, Heiler ultimately decided against running for U.S. Senate, instead supporting U.S. Congresswoman Martha McSally.

In October 2018, it was reported by The Arizona Capitol Times that Symington was contemplating a run for the U.S. Senate in the 2020 special election. The seat was vacated following the death of U.S. Senator John McCain, with former U.S. Senator Jon Kyl being appointed by Governor Doug Ducey to temporarily fill the seat. Upon appointment, Kyl stated that he would only serve in the Senate until the end of 2018 and in 2018 Governor Ducey appointed former Representative Martha McSally to the Senate seat. Symington stated that he would enjoy running against the potential Democratic candidate former attorney general of Arizona, Grant Woods, saying "I can't think of a better candidate to campaign against. We would have a lot of fun dishing it out," while also questioning Woods' party affiliation. Symington also refuted the idea of the legal issues that led to his resignation as Governor having an effect on his candidacy, adding "Elections are about your ideas for the future, where you want to see the country go. It's not settled on old issues, especially as distant as those." In September 2021, Symington became co-chair of Karrin Taylor Robson's campaign for governor, alongside Jan Brewer.

=== Later life and legacy ===
In an op-ed published by The Arizona Republic in 2012, Symington took time to reflect on his time as Governor of Arizona, and spoke positively about his experiences, despite the federal government's prosecution that led to his resignation. Symington wrote, "Even as we were charging ahead to reform public policy in the brief time given any governor, I was visited by a ruthless pursuit from the world's most inexhaustible adversary. Let it be recorded that few have fought the federal government and prevailed, but by grace and the love of family and friends, we did." In analyzing his performance as governor, Symington also stated in the retrospective, "Arizona's government operated comparatively well, without excess partisan rancor and without so many of the Republican peacocks and Democrat bantam roosters we see running around the political barnyard today." He also wrote that he believed Arizona would be "better off" had he been able to further reduce income taxes during his term, if not eliminate them, and also praised Arizona as the home of charter schools, an initiative which began under his tenure.

In July 2016, a discovery was made by Arizona historian Jack August when he located a large collection of missing documents regarding Symington's governorship. There were 305 boxes total, which was estimated to take at least 500-man-hours to process, and consisted of policy papers, records from his federal trial, photos from White House visits, and a humorous photo of Symington in a Phoenix Suns gorilla costume. The records were located at a storage facility approximately four miles from the state Capitol building, and was described by The Arizona Republic as the "equivalent of finding the Lost Dutchman's gold." Prior to their unearthing, Symington had stated that he had no idea where the records were located, despite ordering his staff to box up the records for a swift transition in the event he was sentenced to prison. State law requires that public officials provide their records for public access, but enforcement of this law has been inconsistent and rarely imposed.

On February 9, 2017, an exhibit titled "The Surreal Life of Fife Symington" was opened at the Arizona Capitol Museum, with "personal mementoes and a trove of family history items" that were discovered by Symington, in a trunk belonging to his mother, serving as the centerpiece for the display. Political campaign materials, Symington's Bronze Star from his service in the military, a cast bronze relief of Symington's grandfather Henry Clay Frick, and yearbooks were also included. Secretary of State Michele Reagan officiated the opening ceremony. Jack August was one of the organizers of the exhibit, but died only a few weeks before its opening.

== Personal life ==
From his first wife Symington has two children and five grandchildren. His second wife was Ann Olin Pritzlaff, an ordained deacon in the Episcopal Church. They have three children and eight grandchildren. He is currently married for the third time.

== Electoral history ==
Republican primary for the 1990 Arizona gubernatorial election
Party	Candidate	Votes	%	±%
Republican	Fife Symington	163,010	43.78%	
Republican	Evan Mecham	91,136	24.48%	
Republican	Fred Koory	61,487	16.51%	
Republican	Sam Steiger	49,019	13.17%	
Republican	Bob Barnes	7,672	2.06%	

Arizona gubernatorial general election, 1990
Party	Candidate	Votes	%	±%
Republican	Fife Symington	523,984	49.65%	
Democratic	Terry Goddard	519,691	49.24%	
Write-ins		11,731	1.11%	

Arizona gubernatorial runoff election, 1991
Party	Candidate	Votes	%	±%
Republican	Fife Symington	492,569	52.36%	
Democratic	Terry Goddard	448,168	47.64%	

Republican primary for the 1994 Arizona gubernatorial election
Party	Candidate	Votes	%	±%
Republican	Fife Symington	202,588	68.14%	
Republican	Barbara Barrett	94,740	31.86%	

Arizona gubernatorial election, 1994
Party	Candidate	Votes	%	±%
Republican	Fife Symington	593,492	52.54%	
Democratic	Eddie Basha	500,702	44.33%	
Libertarian	John Buttrick	35,222	3.12%	
Write-ins		191	0.02%	

== See also ==
- List of governors of Arizona
- List of people pardoned or granted clemency by the president of the United States

Party political offices
Preceded by Evan Mecham	Republican nominee for Governor of Arizona; 1990, 1994	Succeeded by Jane Dee Hull
Political offices
Preceded by Rose Mofford	Governor of Arizona; 1991–1997	Succeeded by Jane Dee Hull
U.S. order of precedence (ceremonial)
Preceded by Martha McSally as Former U.S. Senator	Order of precedence of the United States; Within Arizona	Succeeded by Jan Brewer as Former Governor
Preceded by Susana Martinez as Former Governor	Order of precedence of the United States; Outside Arizona	Succeeded by Jan Brewer as Former Governor
