= J. Fife Symington Jr. =

American diplomat (1910–2007)

United States Ambassador to Trinidad and Tobago
- In office July 8, 1969 – November 14, 1971
- President: Richard Nixon
- Preceded by: William A. Costello
- Succeeded by: Anthony D. Marshall

Personal details
- Born: John Fife Symington Jr. August 27, 1910 Baltimore, Maryland, U.S.
- Died: December 9, 2007 (aged 97) Baltimore, Maryland, U.S.
- Party: Republican
- Spouse: Martha Howard Frick (m. 1939; div. 1988)
- Domestic partner: Natalie Brengle
- Children: 4, including Martha, Fife
- Education: Kent School
- Alma mater: Princeton University

John Fife Symington Jr. (August 27, 1910 – December 9, 2007) was an American diplomat who served as United States ambassador to Trinidad and Tobago and an airline pioneer.

== Early life ==
Symington was born in Baltimore, Maryland, on August 27, 1910, to Arabella (Hambleton) and John Fife Symington. His uncle, John Hambleton, who was a fighter pilot in World War I and a founder of Pan American World Airways, got him interested in flying.

After graduating from Kent School, Kent, Connecticut in 1929, he earned a bachelor's degree at Princeton University in 1933 where he became a member of the Ivy Club; that year, he also rode as a gentleman jockey in the My Lady's Manor and Grand National point-to-point races.

== Career ==
During the Great Depression, he borrowed and traveled on Pan American to Miami, San Juan, Trinidad, and South America. After his travels, he got a pilot license and emerged unhurt from three plane crashes. He got a job with the airline in 1934 and was assigned to Rio de Janeiro. When he returned from Brazil, he was given the job of traffic manager when Pan Am opened a terminal on Colgate Creek near Dundalk in 1937.

In 1939, Juan Trippe assigned Symington to London to open up an international office. There he managed trans-Atlantic traffic for the United States Navy, and held the rank of lieutenant. He left Pan Am in 1948 to become an executive assistant at the Chrysler Building.

=== Political career ===
Symington unsuccessfully ran for Congress in Maryland's 2nd congressional district in 1958, 1960 and 1962. He campaigned for Republican Presidential candidate Barry Goldwater in 1964. He hosted a Goldwater event at his Lutherville home that year. Former Vice President Richard M. Nixon attended the event.

In 1969, after Nixon was elected President, he named Symington ambassador to Trinidad and Tobago. Symington held the post until 1971. During his time as ambassador he had to deal with a political crisis when the military attempted a coup against prime minister Eric Williams.

Symington was unhappy with his posting, and began negotiating with the Nixon administration for an ambassadorship in Europe. Symington and Nixon's attorney Herbert W. Kalmbach worked out a deal in which Symington would provide a $100,000 campaign donation to Nixon's 1972 reelection campaign in exchange for a post in either Spain or Portugal. However, the deal was exposed during the Watergate scandal and Kalmbach was sentenced to prison for his part in the arrangement.

== Personal life ==
In 1939 he married Martha Howard Frick, granddaughter of steel magnate Henry Clay Frick; they had three daughters and one son:

- Martha Frick (Symington) Sanger
- Arabella (Symington) Dane
- Helen Clay (Symington) Chace
- Fife Symington, who served as Governor of Arizona from 1991 until 1997.

They later divorced in 1988, and Frick died in 1996. He also had a twenty-year relationship with Natalie Brengle until his death. The two never married.

Symington died on December 9, 2007, at the Gilchrist Center for Hospice Care in Baltimore, Maryland, due to complications of old age. He was survived by all his children.

== Notes ==
Diplomatic posts
Preceded by William A. Costello	United States Ambassador to Trinidad and Tobago; 1969–1971	Succeeded by Anthony D. Marshall
