= Martha Frick Symington Sanger =

Martha Frick Sanger (née Symington; born 1944) is an American writer and the great-granddaughter of Henry Clay Frick. She is also the older sister of Fife Symington III, the former Governor of Arizona.

== Works ==
External videos
- Presentation by Sanger on Henry Clay Frick: An Intimate Portrait at the National Portrait Gallery, October 29, 1998, C-SPAN

- Maryland Blood: An American Family in War and Peace, (Baltimore: Maryland Historical Society, 2016)
- Helen Clay Frick: Bittersweet Heiress, biography (Pittsburgh: University of Pittsburgh Press, 2007)
- The Henry Clay Frick Houses: Architecture-Interiors-Landscapes In the Golden Era, nonfiction (New York: Monacelli Press, 2001)
- Henry Clay Frick: An Intimate Portrait, biography (New York: Abbeville Press, 1998)
