= 2015 Phoenix mayoral election =

- August 25, 2015
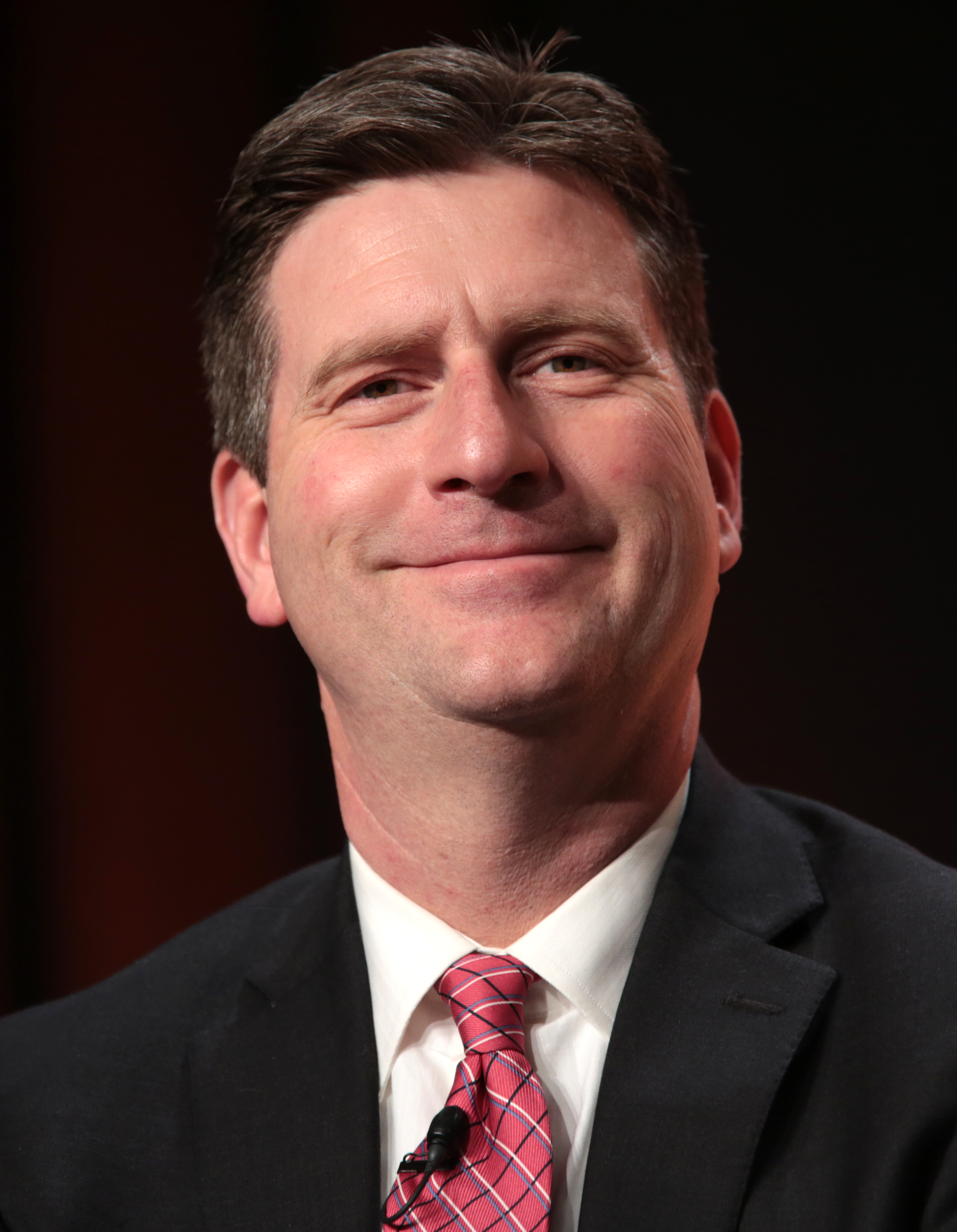

Candidate	Greg Stanton	Anna Maria Brennan	Matt Jette
Popular vote	85,629	38,118	7,356
Percentage	65.3%	29.1%	5.6%
- Results by city council district Stanton: 50–60% 60–70% 70–80%
Mayor before election
Greg Stanton
Democratic
Elected mayor
Greg Stanton
Democratic

The 2015 Phoenix mayoral election took place on August 25, 2015, to elect the Mayor of Phoenix, Arizona. This was also the day of elections for Council Members in Districts 1, 3, 5, and 7.

The election is officially nonpartisan. Had no candidate won a majority of the vote, a runoff would have been held on November 3 between the top two finishers.

Incumbent mayor Greg Stanton ran for re-election to a second term in office and won re-election.

== Candidates ==
=== Declared ===
- Anna Maria Brennan, businesswoman and candidate for Mayor in 2011
- Matt Jette, teacher, Republican candidate for Governor in 2010, and Democratic nominee for Arizona's 6th congressional district in 2012
- Greg Stanton, incumbent Mayor

=== Declined ===
- Sal DiCiccio, District 6 City Councilman
- Phil Gordon, former Mayor
- Christine Jones, former Go Daddy executive and Republican candidate for Governor in 2014

== Polling ==
Hypothetical polling

Poll source	Date(s) administered	Sample size	Margin of error	Greg Stanton	Sal DiCiccio	Other	Undecided
Public Policy Polling	February 4–5, 2015	520	—	49%	23%	—	28%

Poll source	Date(s) administered	Sample size	Margin of error	Greg Stanton	Christine Jones	Other	Undecided
Public Policy Polling	February 4–5, 2015	520	—	50%	21%	—	30%

== See also ==
- List of mayors of Phoenix
