= 2003 Phoenix mayoral election =

- September 9, 2003
- Turnout: 21.10%
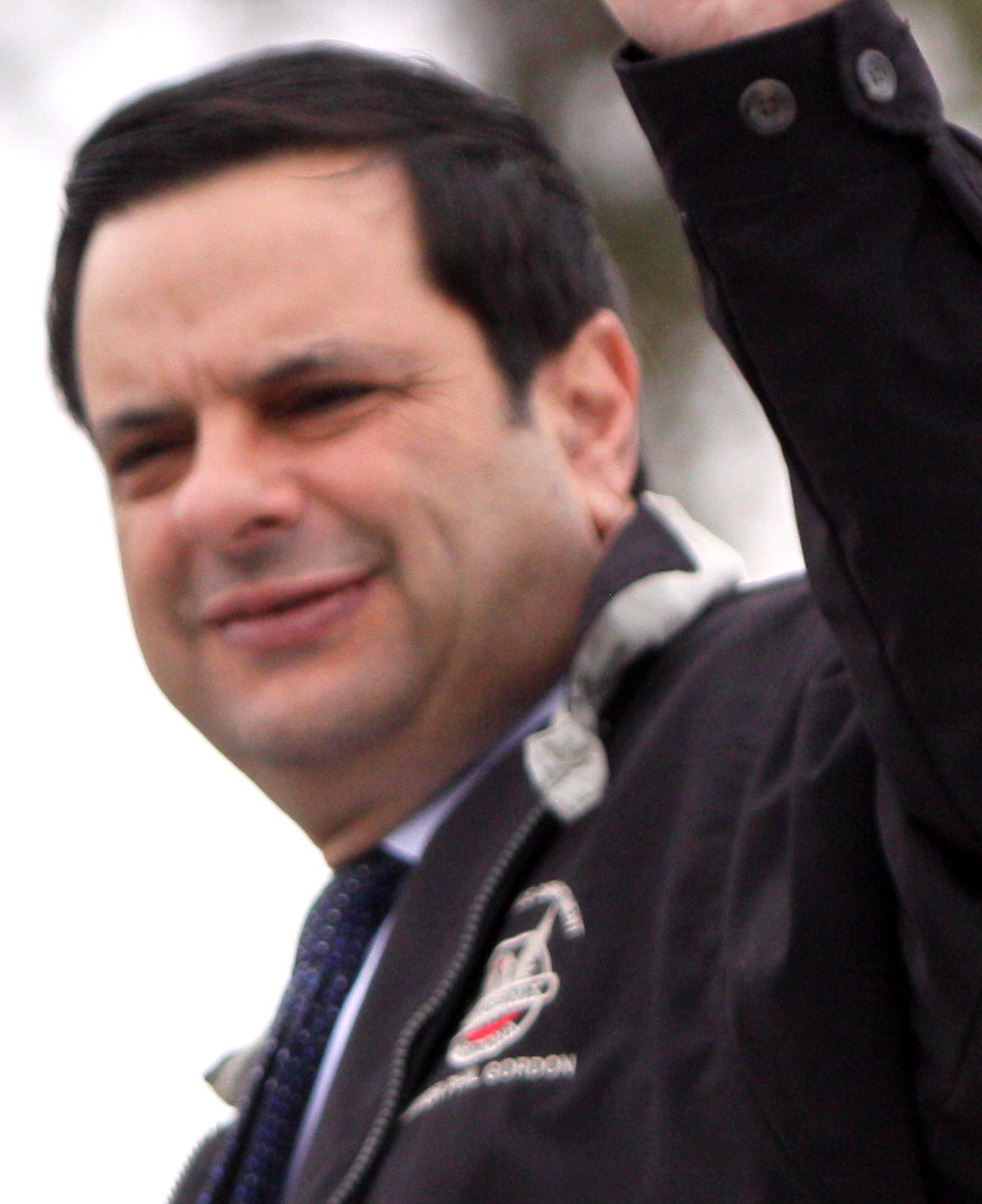

Candidate	Phil Gordon	Randy Pullen
Popular vote	68,961	27,006
Percentage	71.86%	28.14%
Mayor before election
Skip Rimsza
Republican
Elected mayor
Phil Gordon
Democratic

The Phoenix mayoral election of 2003 was held on September 9, 2003, to elect the Mayor of Phoenix, Arizona. The election was formally nonpartisan. This election was held alongside elections for City Council Districts 1, 3, 5 and 7.

Incumbent mayor Skip Rimsza could not seek reelection due to term limit. Phil Gordon, a member of the city council, was elected as the new mayor.

== Results ==
2003 Phoenix mayoral election
Candidate	Votes	%
Phil Gordon (incumbent)	68,961	71.86
Randy Pullen	27,006	28.14
Write-in	3	0.00
Total votes	95,970	100.00

== See also ==
- List of mayors of Phoenix
