= Liz Harris (politician) =

American politician

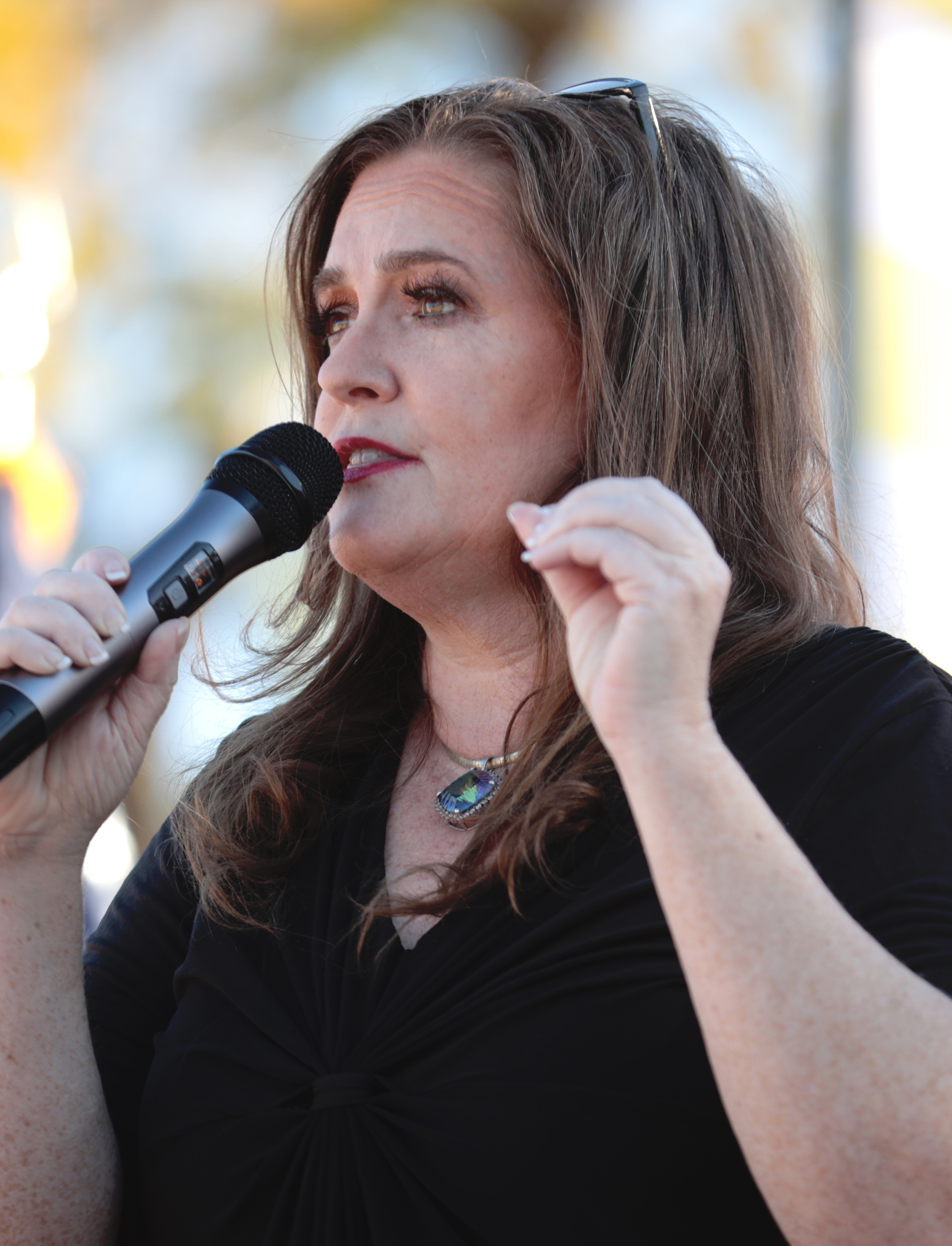
- Harris in 2022

Republican National Committeewoman from Arizona
- Incumbent
- Assumed office April 27, 2024

Member of the Arizona House of Representatives from the 13th district
- In office January 9, 2023 – April 12, 2023 Serving with Jennifer Pawlik
- Preceded by: Tim Dunn
- Succeeded by: Julie Willoughby

Personal details
- Party: Republican

Liz Harris is an American politician and real estate agent from Arizona who serves as the Arizona Republican National Committee National Committeewoman. A member of the Republican Party, she served in the Arizona House of Representatives representing the 13th district from January to April 2023. Her legislative career was marked by her role as a key vote in the Republicans' slim majority and her focus on election-related legislation.

Following the 2020 United States presidential election, Harris became a prominent figure in efforts to challenge and overturn the election results in Arizona. She led a controversial door-to-door canvassing effort that drew scrutiny from the U.S. Department of Justice over potential voter intimidation and was a frequent speaker at conferences promoting election-related conspiracy theories. She has been frequently linked to the QAnon movement and has hosted prominent figures within that community on her platforms.

Harris faced intense criticism after inviting a witness to a joint legislative hearing who made unsubstantiated claims accusing various state officials and organizations of bribery and cartel involvement. On February 23, 2023, Harris invited Jacqueline Breger, a constituent, to testify before Arizona's Joint Senate/House Election Hearing to Strengthen and Increase Confidence in Arizona's 2024 Elections. Breger testified about counties having alleged backdoor portals in their computer systems, which weakened the integrity of the elections. She further elaborated on allegations of other corruption that resulted in the eventual expulsion of Harris.

Following an investigation by the House Ethics Committee, which found that Harris had been "dishonest" and had "damaged the integrity of the House" regarding her prior knowledge of the testimony, she was expelled from the legislature in April 2023 by a bipartisan 46–13 vote. Despite her expulsion, she remained active in party politics and was elected as an RNC National Committeewoman in 2024.

== QAnon affiliation ==
Harris, a real estate agent, is a longtime promoter of QAnon conspiracies. Harris has also maintained significant personal and professional ties to central figures within the QAnon community. When Ron Watkins—a former operator of the imageboard 8chan and a man widely suspected of being the "Q" persona—moved from Japan to Arizona in 2021, he registered to vote using a residential address belonging to a property owned by Harris.

In May 2021, Harris claimed in a video on a QAnon affiliated podcast that her efforts were part of "good versus evil" and that efforts in Arizona would lead to revelations of nationwide election fraud. At the time while QAnon community leaders General Micheal Flynn and Jason Sullivan were staging events using the domino brand, every day on her podcast Harris held up a sign with the QAnon brand quote, "May Arizona be the first domino to fall." Following her expulsion from the Arizona House in 2023, Harris was celebrated as a "hero" and an "icon" within online QAnon communities, with supporters citing her removal as proof of the conspiracies she promoted.

In April 2023, after expulsion from the Arizona House for lying during an ethics committee investigation, Harris became an even bigger hero to some in the QAnon online community who touted her expulsion as proof she was right about her conspiracies. Kari Lake, a prominent supporter of Harris, told Steve Bannon on the War Room, “All they've done is make her an icon now. She's going to be an icon. If they think they've made her lose power, I think Liz Harris is going to gain power from this move.”

== Role spreading multiple conspiracies following the 2020 election ==
In March 2021, Harris's canvassers Steven Steele and Earl Shafer found shredded ballots in a dumpster behind the Maricopa County Election and Tabulation Center and immediately following the incident, Harris, without proof, claimed the ballots had been burned as part of a cover-up conspiracy involving a fire at Supervisor Clint Hickman's farm. As of 2023, Harris and Steele continue to claim that House Speaker Ben Toma, who sought Harris's expulsion from the Legislature, held a bonfire at Toma's home to destroy evidence of his involvement in an unsubstantiated bribery scandal.

In March 2023, Harris invited a woman named Jacqueline Breger to a Joint Legislative Hearing to amplify and promote an outlandish conspiracy that Breger referenced an upcoming book by her boyfriend John Thaler. Thaler, who has an arrest warrant for multiple domestic violence offenses against his ex-wife, made similar claims accusing his ex-wife of participating in a bribery and fraud scheme in multiple failed lawsuits against both his ex-wife and mother-in-law. Before Harris held the hearing, two judges had already dismissed Thaler's claims ruling they were an "elaborate fiction." A federal court had called it a "delusional and fantastical narrative." Emails subsequently obtained by the Arizona Republic showed that Harris knew the details of the fabricated scandal before inviting Breger to testify and that Harris lied about her knowledge and involvement to State Senate staffers when they sought details of the presentation before the hearing.

In September 2023, Harris reported on her social media podcast that legislators were seeking an indictment of Katie Hobbs that week on RICO charges and the rumor quickly escalated to many online viewers believing Hobbs had been indicted.

== Attempts to overturn the 2020 election ==
Harris has been a leading proponent of efforts in Arizona to overturn the 2020 election. Harris testified at a public panel put together by a group of legislative associates of Harris, including Kelly Townsend, Sonny Borelli, and Mark Finchem after the then House Speaker Rusty Bowers refused to allow the group a formal session to amplify Harris's claims of widespread election fraud. During that hearing held on November 30, 2020, Harris testified she had been conducting a canvass and identified illegitimate voters, asking that legislators exercise their power and pull back the Biden electors.

Harris created a website "Crime of the Century" as part of her efforts to spread and promote disinformation about the 2020 election. As part of the effort, she repeatedly made false claims regarding the results of her canvassing efforts which were touted by the U.S. Department of Justice as a form of voter suppression.

== Ethics allegation for dishonest non disclosure ==
The surviving family filed a wrongful death lawsuit alleging Harris knew there was black mold in a home that as a real estate agent Harris knew existed when she sold the home to the family which allegedly resulted in the death of a 41-year-old mother of two young children.

== Post 2020 controversial canvass effort ==
Harris led a controversial canvassing effort with then House Rep. Kelly Townsend following the 2020 election with multiple inaccuracies that were debunked within minutes following the 2020 election. Months after Harris's canvass effort that began in November 2020 was underway, the U.S. Department of Justice issued a formal cease and desist letter alleging the audit effort may amount to voter intimidation. Harris did not stop continuing with her canvass effort and months later issued her canvass report of findings which AP reported as "nonsensical."

== 2020 and 2022 campaigns for state legislature ==
In 2020, Harris unsuccessfully ran for a seat in the Arizona legislature.

In 2022, Harris campaigned for election to the state House from Arizona's 13th Legislative District, a district covering portions of the Phoenix suburbs, specifically south Chandler, west Gilbert, and Sun Lakes in the East Valley.

In the November 2022 election, Harris (along with Democratic Representative Jennifer Pawlik) was elected to the state House from the two-seat 13th District. Harris defeated fellow Republican Julie Willoughby by 275 votes after an automatic recount, in which Harris had a net gain of five votes, concluded in December 2022.

== 2020 and 2022 election denialism ==
Harris espouses election denialism. After Donald Trump lost Arizona in the 2020 presidential election, Harris promoted unsupported claims that the election was "stolen" from Trump. She led a door-to-door canvassing campaign in a bid to find supposed "election fraud" and released a report (possibly debunked by election experts) claiming fraud. The Arizona Attorney General's office, then led by Republican attorney general Mark Brnovich, assigned 60 staffers to investigate the 2020 election; after spending 10,000 hours investigating, no evidence of fraud was found. Harris's door-to-door canvassing effort drew scrutiny from the U.S. Justice Department Civil Rights Division on concerns of potential voter intimidation. Harris claimed in a May 2021 video that her efforts were part of "good versus evil" and that efforts in Arizona would lead to revelations of nationwide election fraud.

In September 2022, Harris spoke at a national conspiracist conference hosted by Mike Lindell, a businessman who had urged Trump to declare martial law to remain in power; Lindell asserted that the summit would be "one of the most important events in history." At the event, Harris promoted claims of election fraud, and claimed that her allies were being persecuted.

On April 24, 2023, Harris held an election fraud seminar in Chandler, Arizona with indicted Colorado Mesa County Recorder Tina Peters, who had reportedly been an ally of Harris for years pushing unfounded conspiracies.

== Arizona legislative career ==
After her election, Harris baselessly claimed that the 2022 Arizona elections, in which Republicans lost top statewide races, was marred by fraud. She threatened to refuse to cast any vote in the House until the election was redone.

Upon taking office in January 2023, she introduced legislation that would ban both mail-in voting and in-person early voting, and make it easier to challenge election results in court.

Although a first-term representative, Harris's vote was important to the Republicans' one-vote majority in the House. (Republicans hold 31 seats, and Democrats 29 seats.) In February 2023, Harris was the sole Republican to vote against a major Republican budget package, defeating the measure.

=== 2023 hearing ===
In February 2023, Harris invited Jacqueline Breger, a Scottsdale insurance agent, to testify before a joint hearing of Republican-controlled House and Senate elections committees. In her 41-minute presentation, Breger claimed that Governor Katie Hobbs, several members of the Maricopa County Board of Supervisors, a dozen Maricopa County Superior Court judges, and the mayor of Mesa had all taken bribes from the Sinaloa Cartel through a housing deed scam as part of a vast money laundering, racketeering, and election fraud scheme. Breger also claimed that the LDS Church was implicated in the supposed conspiracy. Breger offered no evidence to support her baseless claims. In her testimony, Breger relied on an upcoming book by her boyfriend John Thaler, who made similar claims in multiple failed lawsuits against his ex-wife and mother-in-law. Before the hearing, two judges had dismissed Thaler's claims as an elaborate fiction; a federal court had called it a "delusional and fantastical narrative." Emails subsequently obtained by the Arizona Republic showed that Harris knew about the details of the fake scandal before inviting Breger to testify, and that Harris did not disclose her knowledge to state Senate staffers who sought details of the presentation.

While some Republicans in the legislature (such as Wendy Rogers and Rachel Jones) praised Breger, other Arizona Republican legislators, even some of whom had for years entertained unsubstantiated claims of election fraud, disavowed the allegations, which had become increasingly bizarre over time. After the hearing, House Speaker Ben Toma and Senate President Warren Petersen criticized Harris's actions as "irresponsible" and "disgraceful."

Five days after the hearing, Harris distanced herself from Breger's and Thaler's claims, conceding that the presentation "was not sufficient to substantiate these extraordinary claims," but later resumed amplifying the claims on her social media. Democratic Representative Stephanie Stahl Hamilton filed a complaint against Harris with the House Ethics Committee, saying that Harris had made Arizona a "national joke"; Harris asserted that she was constitutionally obligated to allow the testimony.

== Expulsion from Arizona House ==
On April 12, 2023, Harris was expelled from the legislature by a 46–13 vote for damaging "the integrity of the House," for lying to colleagues during a public hearing of the Ethics Committee. After Harris was expelled, one of her canvassers Steve Steele sought her vacant position

Steele, along with Harris and fellow canvasser Earl Shafer who found shredded ballots in a dumpster behind the election center claimed along with Harris, without proof, that the ballots had been burned as part of a cover-up conspiracy involving a fire at Supervisor Clint Hickman's farm. Harris and Steele continue to claim that House leader Toma, who sought Harris's expulsion. had a bonfire at his home burning evidence of his involvement in the conspiracy as part of an alleged cover-up.

Although Harris claimed she did not know prior to the hearing in April 2023 that Breger was going to publicly impugn the character of fellow legislators, former AG's office attorney Jennifer Wright claimed Harris had lunch with her months earlier in January 2023 and at that time Harris discussed the alleged fraudulent deed scheme which Wright alleges she told Harris to go to law enforcement. Wright met and worked with Harris and Recorder Stephen Richer following the 2018 election looking into claims of election irregularities.
