= 2011 Phoenix mayoral election =

- August 30, 2011
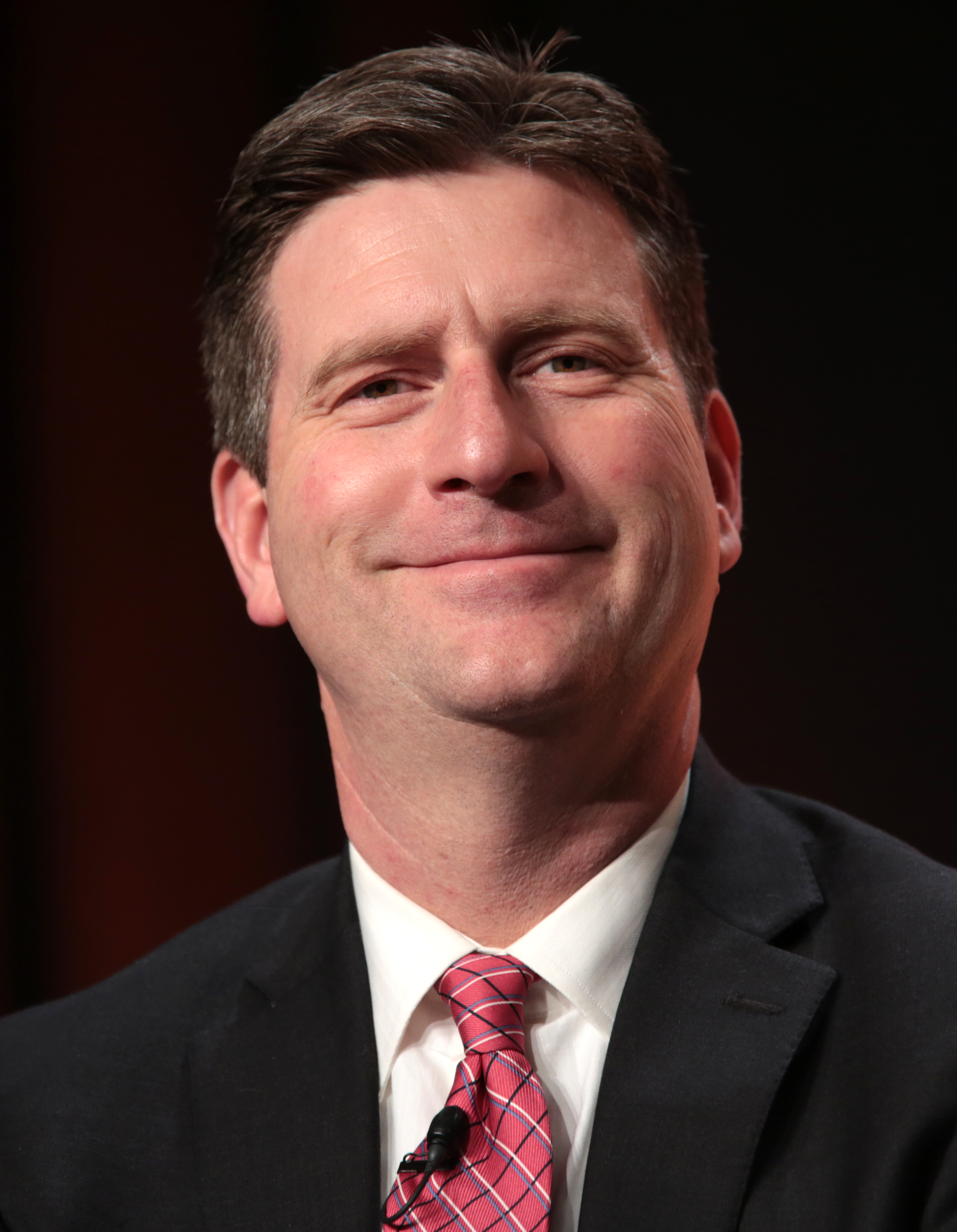

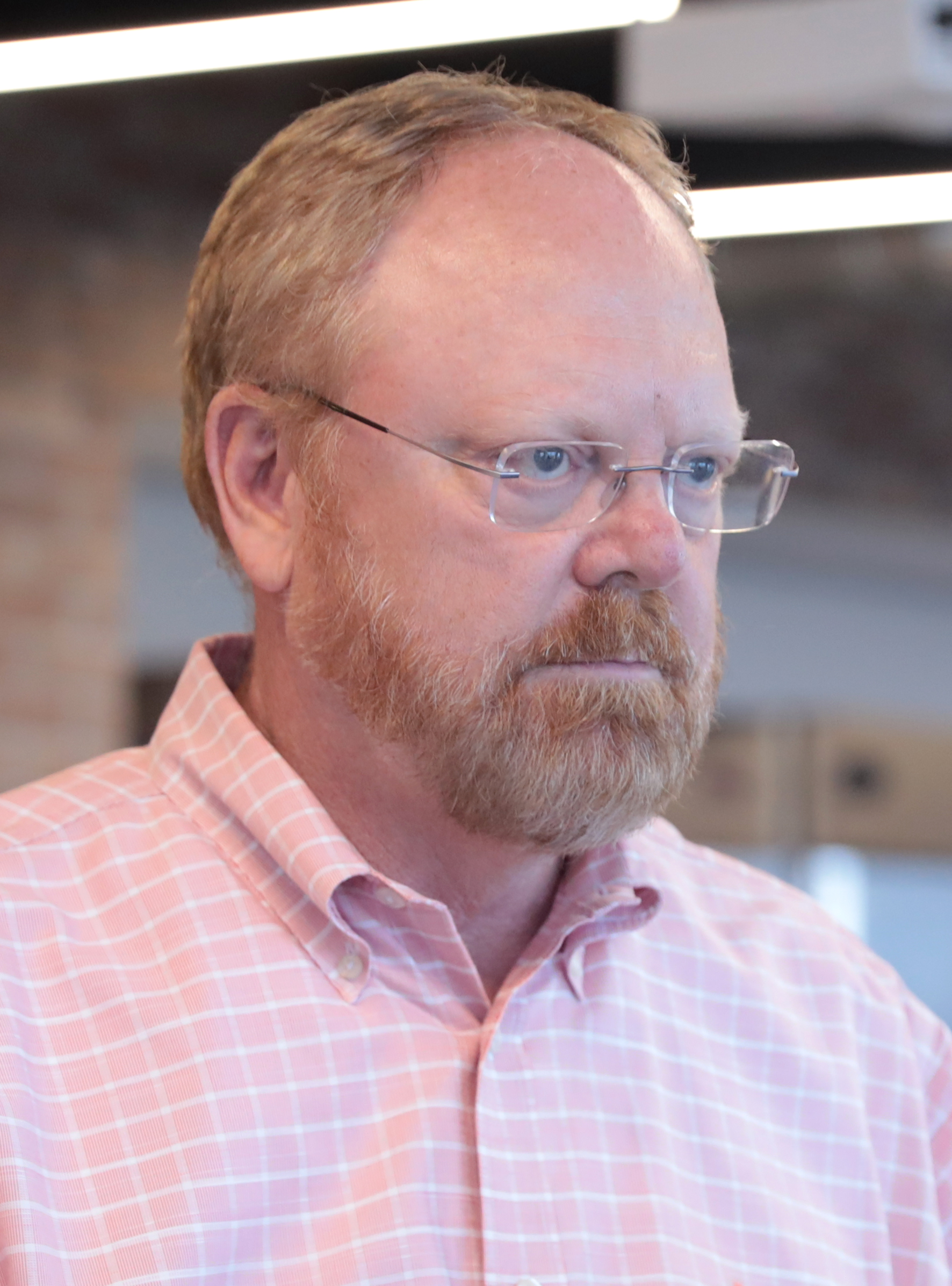

Candidate	Greg Stanton	Wes Gullett	Peggy Neely
First round vote	53,553	29,020	17,984
First round percentage	37.90%	20.54%	12.73%
Runoff vote	94,765	74,320
Runoff percentage	56.05%	43.95%
Candidate	Claude Mattox	Jennifer Wright	Anna Brennan
First round vote	16,842	16,739	7,110
First round percentage	11.92%	11.85%	5.03%
- Results by city council district Stanton: 20–30% 30–40% 40–50%
Mayor before election
Phil Gordon
Democratic
Elected mayor
Greg Stanton
Democratic

The mayoral election for Phoenix, Arizona, United States, in 2011 was held in a two-round system on August 30, 2011, and November 8, 2011. Greg Stanton, a former city councilman, was elected over Wes Gullett, and took office on January 3, 2012, succeeding Phil Gordon, who held the office of Mayor of Phoenix from 2004 to 2012. The election coincided with the Phoenix City Council elections to the four odd-numbered districts (1, 3, 5, 7).

== Background ==
Due to the City of Phoenix's limit of two four-year terms, current Mayor Phil Gordon was ineligible to run for mayor again. As all municipal elections in the City of Phoenix are nonpartisan, the political affiliations of the respective candidates were not present on the ballot paper. In addition, the race was widely regarded as very competitive compared to previous elections, as the last three incumbent mayors ran with little to no opposition.

== Candidates ==
All candidates had to at least 1500 signatures to appear on the August 30 ballot. The city clerk reviewed the signatures and candidates with enough valid signatures appeared on the ballot; the City Clerk had until June 11 at the latest to review all candidates' signatures. Thane Eichenauer failed to collect enough signatures to formally appear on the ballot, but said that he would run a write-in campaign. Alexander Malkoon also fell just short of the 1,500 signatures needed, complimented the slate of remaining candidates and announced he would not run as a write in candidate.

The following candidate collected enough signatures to appear on the ballot:

- Anna Brennan, businesswoman (Republican)
- Wes Gullett, businessman and campaign worker (Republican)
- Claude Mattox, District 5 Councilman (Republican)
- Peggy Neely, former District 2 Councilwoman (Republican)
- Greg Stanton, former District 6 Councilman and former Deputy Attorney General (Democratic)
- Jennifer Wright, attorney (Republican and Tea Party-affiliated)

== Campaign ==
=== District 11 Mayoral Forum ===
On Tuesday, May 10, 2011, the Arizona Legislative District 11 Republican Party invited Republican candidates Peggy Neely, Wes Gullett, Claude Mattox, and Jennifer Wright to a mayoral forum. All but Mattox attended, a Mattox campaign staff member claiming she never received an e-mail of details of the event.

In reaction to the snub, Democratic candidate Greg Stanton said that if a Democratic-sponsored mayoral forum was held, he would not attend if Republicans were excluded.

=== Fundraising ===
Cash on hand As of 12/31/10

- Wes Gullett – $54,600
- Claude Mattox – $340,000
- Peggy Neely – $88,000
- Greg Stanton – $89,000

== Polling ==
Stanton vs. Gullett vs. Mattox vs. Neely, Motorola Group 01/24/11 – 01/28/11

- Stanton – 17.0%
- Gullett – 8.2%
- Mattox – 11.2%
- Neely – 23.8%

== Debates ==
=== April 4 debate ===
Candidates Thane Eichenauer, Wes Gullett, Claude Mattox and Greg Stanton attended the first debate of the campaign. Issues covered included public safety, economic development, education, and the issues of the LGBT community. They addressed the status of Public Safety Manager Jack Harris – who was suspended from overseeing the Phoenix Police Department – and the city's subsidy deal with CityNorth developers, a project that garnered the City of Phoenix a lawsuit over their alleged violation of the gift clause of the Arizona Constitution.
The debate, sponsored by LGBT-rights organization Equality Arizona, saw all candidates claim that they believed in the rights of the gay and lesbian population of Phoenix, with Greg Stanton appearing the most supportive of gay rights, saying "I support equality" when asked if gay and lesbian partnerships should be recognized by the government.

=== April 19 debate ===
Phoenix College held the second mayoral forum of the race, with the same four candidates as the first. However, in this debate, Mayoral hopefuls were asked to share their partisan affiliation. Eichenauer said he became a Libertarian when he was a student, Claude Mattox told the crowd that he has been a Republican since he moved to Arizona. Gullett claimed to have been a registered Republican since the 1980s, but supported Janet Napolitano's bid for Governor; meanwhile, Greg Stanton won applause from the liberal-leaning audience when he responded, "I'm a Democrat and have always been a Democrat".
Wes Gullett promised visiting the top 25 businesses of the city within his first 100 days, whilst Greg Stanton pledged more accountability and transparency in government.

=== May 3 debate ===
Watchdog group Citizens for Phoenix held the third debate, this time with one additional candidate, Peggy Neely. The five squared off over renewable energy, community policing, education, impact fees, tax incentives for economic development, and public arts funding.

== Results ==
Threshold > 50%

First ballot, August 30, 2011

Phoenix mayoral election, 2011
Candidate	Votes	%
Greg Stanton	53,553	37.90
Wes Gullett	29,020	20.54
Peggy Neely	17,984	12.73
Claude Mattox	16,842	11.92
Jennifer Wright	16,739	11.85
Anna Brennan	7,110	5.03
write-ins	52	0.04
Total votes	141,300	100.00

Second ballot, November 8, 2011

Phoenix mayoral election, 2011
Candidate	Votes	%
Greg Stanton	94,765	56.05
Wes Gullett	74,320	43.95
Total votes	169,085	100.00

== See also ==
- List of mayors of Phoenix
