= 1998 Arizona gubernatorial election =

- November 3, 1998
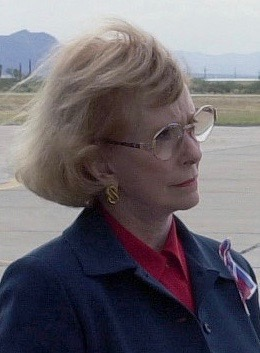

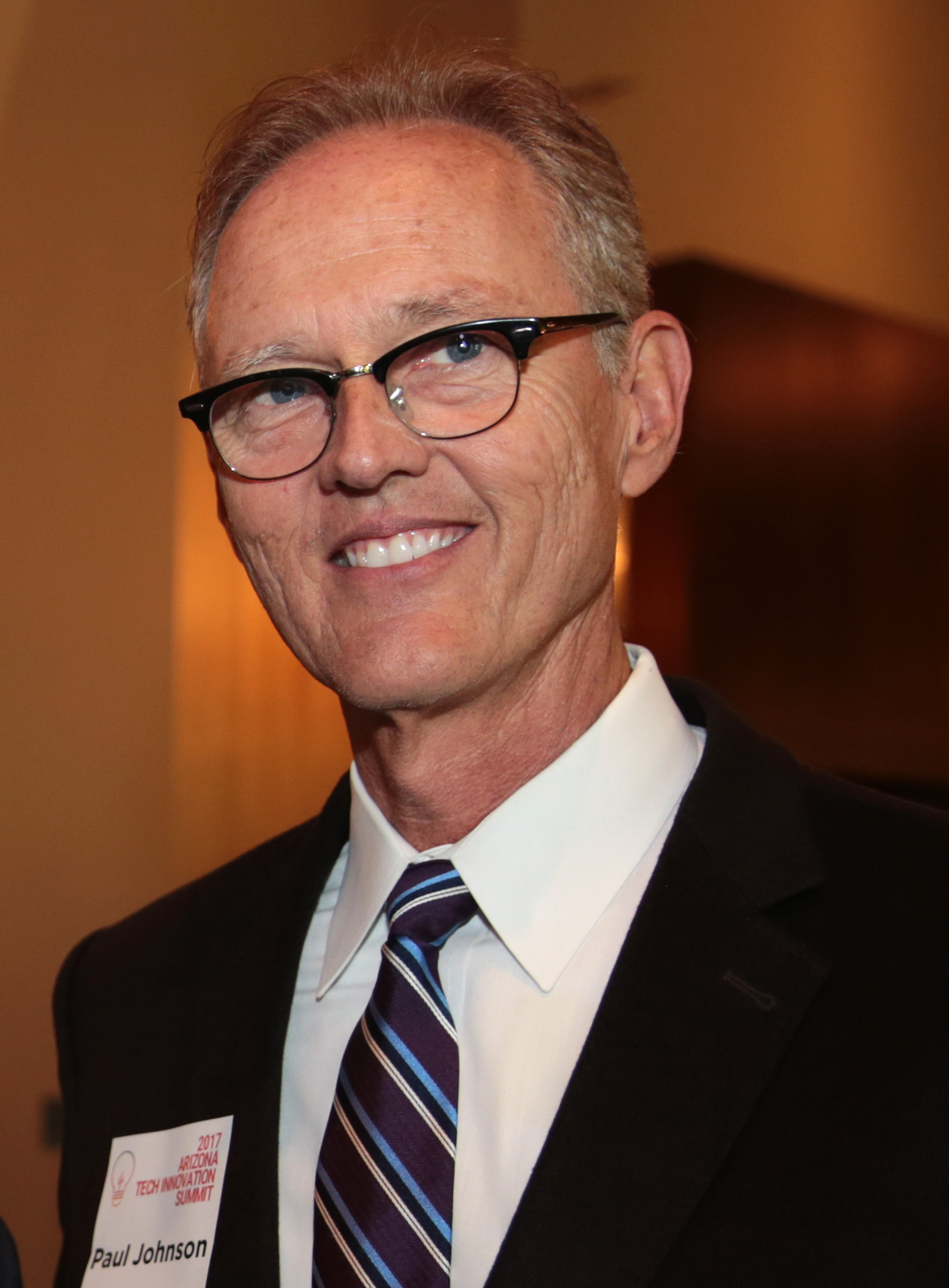
Nominee	Jane Dee Hull	Paul Johnson
Party	Republican	Democratic
Popular vote	620,188	361,552
Percentage	60.95%	35.53%
- County results Hull: 40–50% 50–60% 60–70% Johnson: 50–60%
Governor before election
Jane Dee Hull
Republican
Elected Governor
Jane Dee Hull
Republican

The 1998 Arizona gubernatorial election was held on November 3, 1998 to elect the governor of Arizona. Republican incumbent Jane Dee Hull was re-elected to a second term in office in a landslide over Phoenix mayor Paul Johnson. Hull became the first woman to win a gubernatorial election in Arizona, although not the first woman to serve as governor of Arizona, a distinction held by Rose Mofford.

== Background ==
Fife Symington resigned as governor of Arizona on September 5, 1997, following his conviction on seven counts of bank fraud. His resignation elevated Arizona secretary of state Jane Dee Hull to the office of governor.

== Republican primary ==
=== Candidates ===
- Charles Brown
- Jim Howl
- Jane Dee Hull, incumbent governor of Arizona since 1997

=== Results ===
Republican primary results
Party	Candidate	Votes	%
Republican	Jane Dee Hull (incumbent)	177,324	76.52%
Republican	Jim Howl	30,699	13.25%
Republican	Charles Brown	23,710	10.23%
Total votes		231,733	100.00%

== Democratic primary ==
=== Candidates ===
- Paul Johnson, mayor of Phoenix

=== Results ===
Democratic Primary results
Party	Candidate	Votes	%
Democratic	Paul Johnson	109,044	100.00%
Total votes		109,044	100.00%

== Libertarian primary ==
=== Candidates ===
- Katherine Gallant
- Tom Rawles, Maricopa County supervisor

=== Results ===
Libertarian primary results
Party	Candidate	Votes	%
Libertarian	Katherine Gallant	855	51.82%
Libertarian	Tom Rawles	795	48.18%
Total votes		1,650	100.00%

== Reform primary ==
=== Candidates ===
- Scott Alan Malcomson

=== Results ===
Reform Party primary results
Party	Candidate	Votes	%
Reform	Scott Alan Malcomson	113	100.00%
Total votes		113	100.00%

== General election ==
=== Candidates ===
- Katherine Gallant (Libertarian)
- Jane Dee Hull, incumbent governor of Arizona since 1997 (Republican)
- Paul Johnson, mayor of Phoenix (Democratic)
- Scott Malcomson (Reform)
- D'Herrera Tapia (write-in)
- Alan White (write-in)
- Robert B. Winn (write-in)

=== Polling ===
Poll source	Date(s)	Sample size	Jane Dee Hull (R)	Paul Johnson (D)	Other / undecided (Note: Calculated by taking the difference of 100% and all other candidates combined.)
Harris Insights & Analytics	October 30, 1998	850	55%	38%	7%
Harris Insights & Analytics	October 20, 1998	732	55%	35%	10%
Behavior Research Center (Rocky Mountain Poll)	October 14, 1998	519	53%	31%	16%

=== Results ===
Arizona gubernatorial election, 1998
Party	Candidate	Votes	%	±%
Republican	Jane Dee Hull (incumbent)	620,188	60.95%	+8.41%
Democratic	Paul Johnson	361,552	35.53%	−8.80%
Libertarian	Katherine Gallant	27,150	2.67%	−0.45%
Reform	Scott Malcomson	8,371	0.82%	+0.82%
Independent	Alan White (write-in)	328	0.03%	
Independent	D'Herrera Tapia (write-in)	15	0.00%	
Independent	Robert B. Winn (write-in)	12	0.00%	
Majority		258,636	25.42%	
Total votes		1,017,616	100.00%	
Republican hold		Swing	+17.20%	

==== Results by county ====
County	Jane Dee Hull Republican		Paul Johnson Democratic		Katherine Gallant Libertarian		Scott Malcomson Reform		All Others Write-in		Margin		Total votes cast
County	#	%	#	%	#	%	#	%	#	%	#	%	Total votes cast
Apache	6,832	44.00%	7,904	50.90%	561	3.61%	227	1.46%	5	0.03%	-1,072	-6.90%	15,529
Cochise	15,805	62.49%	8,656	34.22%	663	2.62%	164	0.65%	4	0.02%	7,149	28.27%	25,292
Coconino	15,552	55.53%	10,866	38.80%	1,334	4.76%	252	0.90%	3	0.01%	4,686	16.73%	28,007
Gila	7,367	53.10%	5,982	43.12%	412	2.97%	110	0.79%	2	0.01%	1,385	9.98%	13,873
Graham	4,324	58.93%	2,780	37.88%	163	2.22%	70	0.95%	1	0.01%	1,544	21.04%	7,338
Greenlee	1,367	48.87%	1,328	47.48%	85	3.04%	17	0.61%	0	0.00%	39	1.39%	2,797
La Paz	1,894	57.62%	1,261	38.36%	99	3.01%	33	1.00%	0	0.00%	633	19.26%	3,287
Maricopa	357,308	62.05%	198,175	34.42%	15,004	2.61%	5,031	0.87%	305	0.05%	159,133	27.64%	575,823
Mohave	16,255	55.16%	12,148	41.22%	795	2.70%	272	0.92%	1	0.00%	4,107	13.94%	29,471
Navajo	11,084	54.50%	8,374	41.18%	649	3.19%	226	1.11%	4	0.02%	2,710	13.33%	20,337
Pima	120,506	62.28%	67,533	34.90%	4,370	2.26%	1,077	0.56%	14	0.01%	52,973	27.38%	193,500
Pinal	15,380	54.07%	12,072	42.44%	771	2.71%	217	0.76%	7	0.02%	3,308	11.63%	28,447
Santa Cruz	3,029	51.79%	2,591	44.30%	175	2.99%	54	0.92%	0	0.00%	438	7.49%	5,849
Yavapai	31,631	65.26%	14,806	30.55%	1,545	3.19%	478	0.99%	8	0.02%	16,825	34.71%	48,468
Yuma	11,854	60.49%	7,076	36.11%	524	2.67%	143	0.73%	1	0.01%	4,778	24.38%	19,598
Totals	620,188	60.95%	361,552	35.53%	27,150	2.67%	8,371	0.82%	355	0.03%	258,636	25.42%	1,017,616

==== Counties that flipped from Democratic to Republican ====
- Coconino
- Gila
- Navajo
- Pinal
- Santa Cruz

== See also ==
- Smart Voter Biography of Paul Johnson
- Biography of Jane Dee Hull
