= Julie Willoughby =

American politician

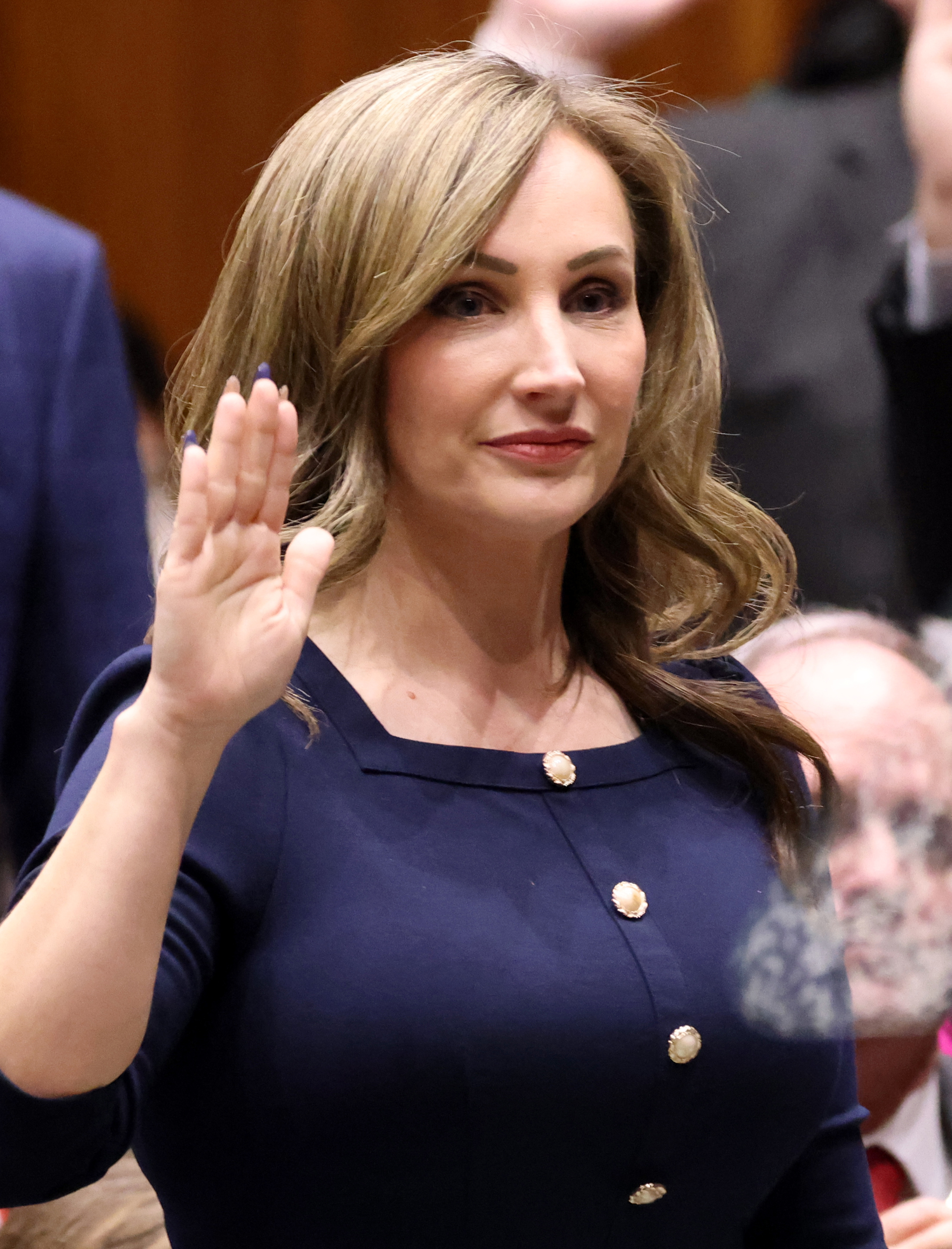
- Willoughby in 2025

Member of the Arizona House of Representatives from the 13th district
- Incumbent
- Assumed office May 5, 2023 Serving with Jeff Weninger
- Preceded by: Liz Harris

Personal details
- Party: Republican
- Education: Arizona State University (BS), MSN
- Website: Campaign website

Julie Willoughby is an American politician and ER nurse from Chandler, Arizona. A Republican, she is a member of the Arizona House of Representatives and took office on May 5, 2023. Willoughby was appointed in May 2023 from the 13th legislative district, which includes much of Chandler and the entirety of Sun Lakes.

Willoughby originally ran for office in 2018 and lost in the primary to Jeff Weninger and Nora Ellen Mesnard (mother of J.D. Mesnard). Four years later, in 2022, she ran again and won the Republican primary election alongside Liz Harris. Willoughby would go on to lose the general election, placing third to Harris and Jennifer Pawlik. After Harris was expelled from the Arizona House of Representatives, Willoughby was one of three names submitted to the Maricopa County Board of Supervisors to be appointed to replace Harris. In a 4–1 vote, the Board of Supervisors selected Willoughby and she was sworn in the same day. She won in 2024 alongside Jeff Weninger.

Willoughby appeared as an emergency room nurse in a 2024 swing state political issue ad for the Preserve America PAC, campaigning against the Biden/Harris administration's response to asylum seekers at the Mexico–United States border.

State Representative Julie Willoughby taking the Oath of Office, 5 May 2023
