= Kristie O'Brien =

American politician

Member-elect of the Arizona Senate from the 13th district
- Assuming office January 2027
- Succeeding: J. D. Mesnard

Personal details
- Party: Democratic

Kristie O'Brien is an American politician. A member of the Democratic Party, she is the member-elect for the 13th district of the Arizona Senate.
