= Milton H. Graham =

American politician (1919–2006)

49th Mayor of Phoenix
- In office January 2, 1964 – January 2, 1970
- Preceded by: Samuel Mardian
- Succeeded by: John D. Driggs

Personal details
- Born: March 23, 1919 Fairfield, Iowa
- Died: August 25, 2006 (aged 87) Phoenix, Arizona
- Spouse(s): Margaret Elizabeth Bouck; Charlotte Kelly
- Education: Parsons College

Milton H. Graham (March 23, 1919 – August 25, 2006) was an American politician. He served as mayor of Phoenix, Arizona from 1964 to 1970. A veteran of World War II, he was a water softening equipment distributor.
