= Paul Johnson (American politician) =

American politician (born 1959)

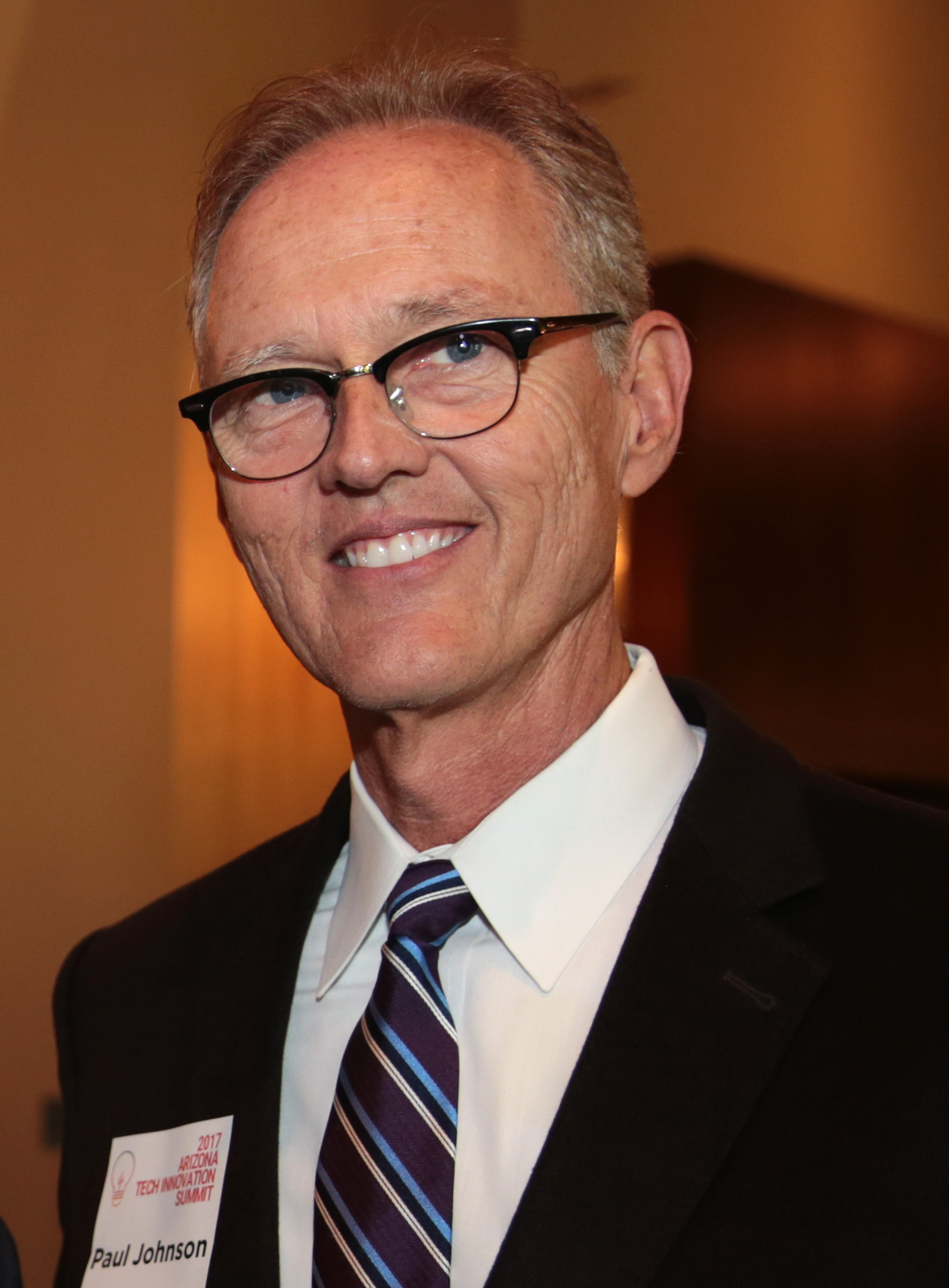
- Johnson in 2017

1st Chair of the Arizona Independent Party
- Incumbent
- Assumed office July 31, 2025
- Preceded by: Position established

54th Mayor of Phoenix
- In office February 16, 1990 – March 16, 1994
- Preceded by: Terry Goddard
- Succeeded by: Skip Rimsza; John B. Nelson (acting); Thelda Williams (interim)

Personal details
- Born: Paul Edward Johnson Jr. July 6, 1959 (age 67) Phoenix, Arizona, U.S.
- Party: No Labels Party (since 2025)
- Other political affiliations: Democratic (Formerly)
- Education: Arizona State University, Tempe; University of Phoenix (BA)

Paul Edward Johnson Jr. (born July 6, 1959, in Phoenix, Arizona) is an American politician from the state of Arizona. Johnson was the mayor of Phoenix from 1990 to 1994. Johnson grew up in Sunnyslope. Johnson was the Democratic nominee for Governor of Arizona in 1998, losing in a landslide to incumbent Governor Jane Dee Hull. He later left the Democratic Party and became an independent. In 2025, Johnson became chairman of the Arizona Independent Party.

Johnson attended Sunnyslope grade school and graduated from Sunnyslope High School. Johnson took almost a decade to earn his undergraduate degree as he worked days and went to school at night. He majored in history at Arizona State University and received a Bachelor of Arts in Business Administration from the University of Phoenix. Paul also attended the Harvard Kennedy School executive program.

== Early life and education ==
Paul Edward Johnson Jr. was born in Phoenix, Arizona on July 6, 1959. Johnson grew up in Sunnyslope, an urban poverty pocket area inside of Phoenix. Sunnyslope was established as Target Area F, an area designated as slum and blight for federal funds.

Johnson graduated from attended Sunnyslope grade school, and Sunnyslope High School. Johnson took almost a decade to earn his undergraduate degree as he worked days and went to school at night. He graduated from Arizona State University with a major in history and received an MSBA from the University of Phoenix. Paul also attended the Harvard Kennedy School executive program.

== Biography ==
Paul Johnson was first elected to the Phoenix City Council in 1985 at the age of 25. While serving in his second term in 1990, Johnson was selected by the council to fill the vacancy left by outgoing mayor Terry Goddard, who had resigned his office in order to run for governor. Johnson would go on to run for mayor in his own right in 1993. Running unopposed, he was elected with 99.7% of the vote.

After serving one year and three months of his own term as mayor, Johnson announced his resignation to run for governor. Johnson ran against Goddard who was making his second bid in 1994, but they both lost to another primary candidate, popular supermarket owner Eddie Basha. Johnson again sought the governorship in 1997, running unopposed in the primary but losing to Republican incumbent Jane Dee Hull who became Governor through succession after Governor Fife Symington stepped down on September 5, 1997.

Johnson has started multimillion-dollar technology companies and several countercyclical real-estate funds. He is the co-founder of Redirect Health, a company based in Phoenix, Arizona, with a nationwide footprint, focusing on transforming healthcare for low wage employees and in the process of disrupting the current healthcare system.

== Career ==
=== Phoenix City Council ===
Johnson ran for the city council in 1985, at 25 years old. He ran in the nonpartisan race as a registered Democrat against Ann Lynch, a Republican in a district that was heavily registered Republican. Johnson was expected to lose. His campaign was known for its grassroots efforts with volunteers knocking on almost all 90,000 registered doors in the district. Johnson captured the majority of votes in the general election and went on to win in a runoff election. The win shocked pundits like Pat Murphy, Arizona Republic columnists, and many who believed Johnson was too young and was in the wrong party for the district. They credited the great political team Johnson assembled. When Johnson was sworn in, he was the youngest councilperson to ever serve on the Phoenix City Council.

Johnson was known as the “Kid from Sunnyslope” and as a councilperson, he tried to improve living conditions in the poverty pocket where he was raised. As a councilperson, he developed a “specific plan” to improve the area and activated a citizens committee to create buy in. The plan included buying industrial properties inside the Sunnyslope area that were eyesores and presented safety challenges to the neighborhood and the very beginning stages of planning transit for the area that would be used to promote extending the light rail into Sunnyslope when it was funded years later. He worked with developers to save historic sites like the Good Shepard Home on 19th and Dunlap. Johnson organized neighborhoods to combat what he called “the flight, the blight, and the gangs.”

Johnson also personally committed to taking on a physical job for a day in each of the city departments. These included working in a sewer, working on hot streets laying asphalt in the summer, and suiting up as a police officer in a drug raid into a Crips gang household.

As a councilperson, Johnson focused on economic development and the environment, trying to find the right balance between business and conservation. Among other issues, Johnson fought with oil company lobbyists and became the primary lead in the state to adopt an Ethanol ethical-based fuel. Johnson's goal was to bring the state air quality standards into compliance by reducing carbon monoxide.

Johnson also fought with developers to protect the Phoenix Mountain Preserve and pushed for development standards that focused on better design. Johnson took the lead on the local effort to reduce Chlorofluorocarbons (CFCs) that were endangering the world's ozone protective shield. He was an early advocate for creating a city recycling program. Johnson also called for the planting of more than a million trees in the city to help lower carbon monoxide and cool the local environment.

Johnson was known for his hard work, for the fact that he missed very few meetings, and for his enthusiasm for the job.

=== Mayor of Phoenix ===
In a contentious process, Paul Johnson was appointed in 1990 to fill the seat vacated by Terry Goddard. Goddard left to make an unsuccessful bid for governor of Arizona. At 25, Johnson was the youngest person to serve on the Phoenix City Council. At 30, he became the youngest person to serve as Mayor. The challenges to his new administration were numerous and often his age was called into question in terms of his ability to meet the challenges.

During his first 100 days in office, Johnson focused on economic development and the poor economy. While this took significant amounts of his time during his first two years as mayor, Johnson had a robust city agenda and was actively engaged in decisions surrounding the environment, education, social justice, ethics, and crime.

Johnson continued his program of working with city departments, including significant time working as a uniformed patrol officer. He was on-site for most major police incidents, and became known in the community as the “Top Gun.” He worked in the city sewers, as a bus driver, and alongside other city workers. He often took the approach of sacrifice at the top, including agreeing to be drug tested himself on a regular basis to assuage police officers who were worried about new standards for drug testing.

==== The Phoenix Economic Crisis ====
Johnson served as mayor of Phoenix through the 1990 recession. The Phoenix economy, heavily dependent on real estate, began to falter in 1989, six months before Johnson took office, after the collapse of the savings and loan institutions. This crisis caused deep deficiencies in revenues for the City of Phoenix and significant changes in the social, business, and political landscape of the state.

Paul Johnson became the mayor of Phoenix on February 21, 1990, at the beginning of this crisis. Then came the inflation of oil prices when on August 2, 1990, the Republic of Iraq invaded the State of Kuwait. In response, the Federal Reserve created a restrictive monetary policy contributing to an economic recession. The effects of the recession and the savings and loan crash resulted in a massive crash of real-estate values in the Phoenix market. Congress created the Office of Thrift Supervision and the Resolution Trust Corporation (RTC) was established. Nationwide, the RTC closed 747 S&Ls with assets of over $407 billion. Johnson appointed an economic development committee to study the effects the RTC would have on the local economy.

The recession resulted in many business failures including locally, America West Airlines, a local Phoenix company, which filed for bankruptcy. As businesses failed and real estate collapsed, Phoenix sales tax revenue and property taxes were significantly impacted. During this downturn of city revenue, Johnson balanced the city's budget and reorganized the city bond program, assisting the airline exit bankruptcy.

Johnson responded to the savings and loan crash, and the recession that ensued, by focusing on bringing business to Phoenix, international flights, and creating the Valley's Greater Phoenix Growth Corporation (GPEC.) He was steadfast in holding the line on taxes to help the private sector recover, cutting the size of government, allowing the bidding of city services, dropping the cost of those city services, and placing a focus on economic development and trade. Under Johnson's administration, the city had to cut more than 500 positions, saved $25 million through outsourcing more than 25 different services in the city, and made major adjustments to the city's bond program that was considered a major test of the new mayor. Johnson was able to manage the significant loss of revenues from the recession without a tax increase and accomplished a small decrease in property taxes.

Several other crises caused by the recession included a conflict between two major airlines—America West and Southwest Airlines—that threatened America West moving its headquarters out of Arizona. The other was a transit strike. Johnson successfully helped bring a compromise between America West Airlines and Southwest Airlines keeping both in Phoenix Sky Harbor Airport Terminal 4, which became very important to the city bond rating when a year later America West Airlines would file for bankruptcy.

During the recession, Johnson pushed the city to build infrastructure and public facilities. He pushed for more freeways, began the planning of transit, built a new basketball arena for the Phoenix Suns, and used the Sun's games with Chicago Bulls in the 1993 NBA playoffs to promote pride in the community. He formed the Phoenix Pride Commission to focus on what citizens had to be proud of, and highlight why Phoenix was such a great place to live.

Johnson built relations with other national economic interests that assisted in financing the basketball arena and securing funding for the Japanese Friendship Garden at Margaret T. Hance Park. While a municipality's economy is typically driven by national and even international trends, Johnson was credited with helping the Phoenix economy turn around.

The nationwide recession had a significant impact on the morale of city employees. In response, Johnson began a process of visiting and listening to employees and actually continued a program he started as a city councilperson, working for a day in each of the city's major departments to understand the workers. Johnson worked on city streets, parks, cleaning sewers, as a firefighter, and as a police officer. His goal was to connect with city workers, understand the pain they felt. The result was noticed in the Bertelsmann Award, whose presenters pointed out that during what could have been disastrous in some communities with cutbacks and labor problems, the city of Phoenix was at an all-time high in city morale, declaring it one of the best-run cities in the world.

==== Martin Luther King Day Crisis ====
In 1986, the United States began observing Dr. Martin Luther King Jr. as a national holiday. Then-Governor Bruce Babbitt used an executive order to officially make MLK Day an Arizona holiday. In 1987, Evan Mecham's first act as governor was to abolish the holiday. In 1990, a ballot initiative to establish the holiday was rejected by Arizona voters causing a loss of conventions business and the NFL rescinded Phoenix as the site for Super Bowl XXVII costing Arizona potentially $350 million in business revenue.

As a newly elected mayor, Johnson took three approaches to the loss of the holiday. One was to counterattack the NFL, and specifically Philadelphia Eagles owner Norman Bramam for what Johnson called in an open letter the “Hypocrisy of the moral watchdog for the NFL,” due to Bramam keeping his car lot open during the holiday but criticizing Arizona. The second approach was to push hard to bring conventions and other economic development proposals back to Phoenix, which had passed the holiday, countering that Phoenix should not be punished for actions of the state. This became an almost exhausting task. The third was to push Arizona business leaders to bring about a second vote on the holiday.

In pushing for the holiday, Johnson focused the community on the moral reasons for the holiday and began to bring in civil rights leaders including Coretta Scott King and Rosa Parks to frame the reasons for the holiday. On November 3, 1992, the MLK holiday passed, the NFL Super Bowl returned in 1996, 2008, and 2015, but in 1993, Arizona became the only state in the nation at the time to pass the holiday by a public vote.

In addition to the MLK holiday, Johnson focused on improving civil rights, equal rights, and human rights. He held open forums to talk about race and equality, appointed record numbers of women and minorities to boards and pushed to employ more black officers in public safety. Johnson also advocated for a black cable network for Phoenix cable. The Johnson Council passed the Human Rights Ordinance that prohibited discrimination against employees based on sexual orientation. The ordinance was very controversial and more conservative members of the council wanted a public vote. Johnson organized members of the council to stop the public vote and it passed by a majority vote of the council. The ordinance was one of the first human rights ordinances in the nation to prohibit discrimination against employees based on sexual orientation.

==== Crime/Guns & Curfews ====
In the 1990s, juvenile crime and gang violence was increasing. Johnson attempted to balance a conservative fiscal and economic agenda with a liberal social agenda. Under Johnson's administration, several initiatives were implemented, including a Juvenile Curfew and “Kids Gun Law” that resulted in Johnson being sued by both the National Rifle Association and the American Civil Liberties Union.

The Kids Gun Law originated after a shooting of young juveniles at a Phoenix skating rink. When the law passed, gun lobbies openly opposed banning minors from being able to carry weapons. Johnson pushed other Arizona cities to adopt his Phoenix kids gun law, as known gang members actually opposed the measure, and the NRA filed litigation against the city.

Johnson and Chicago Mayor Richard M. Daley also worked with the Clinton Administration and then-Attorney General Janet Reno to stop law enforcement agencies from selling seized weapons to gun dealers and organized support from cities across the nation. Johnson also led efforts to ban the types of semiautomatic weapons being used by gang members.

Johnson also fought a lawsuit from the ACLU after he implemented a curfew. The ACLU pointed out their client, a young white girl, was a good student, a cheerleader who lived in an upper-middle-class white neighborhood, and had permission from her parents to be out after 2 AM. Johnson attacked the lawsuit, saying that the curfew wasn't designed to punish kids, it was designed to protect kids pointing out that young white teenagers die just as easily when hit by a stray bullet as do poor minority children. He also stated that he did not want police officers trying to figure out which kids were good kids and which were bad kids. Johnson's attack on the lawsuit was credited for building support for the minorities who originally opposed the curfew.

Other programs Johnson focused on were a school uniform program, a refuse building for kids, a basketball camps for kids, and increased funding for police officers through a public referendum. Johnson also called for individual responsibility by taking part in block-watch and requiring parents to participate in community service work when their kids broke curfew. Johnson's focus on juvenile crime in the street through curfews, school uniforms, kids gun laws, and increased funding for police, assisted in a 73% drop in violent juvenile crime in Phoenix and a cut in graffiti in hard-hit areas.

=== Indian School Park and Florida Swamps ===
In 1986, U.S. Senator Paula Hawkins, a Republican from Florida, was in a race with Democrat Bob Graham. One of the key issues was protecting Florida wetlands and swapping “alligator alley” for a prime piece of property in downtown Phoenix called the Indian School Park. The goal for the trade was to help Hawkins in her race. She lost, but the trade of the Florida wetlands for Phoenix's iconic Indian School property was completed.

Mayor Johnson became an early critic. He was a leader in the community to force a deal with the developer who purchased the property and intended to turn it into a very dense commercial project. The plan created to save the park became known as the “Johnson Plan.”

Citizens and the business community wanted to build a grand park. Johnson led the opposition to the proposal in Congress.

After a heated fight, Johnson was able to land a significant portion of the Indian School Park in trade for a commercial property in downtown Phoenix. The site has developed into one of the city's best parks and the result was praised by the community.

=== National political figure ===
Johnson was deeply involved in Gary Hart's 1988 presidential campaign and was the chairman of several presidential campaigns in Arizona including those of Paul Tongas and General Wesley Clark. Johnson's leadership in the Paul Tsongas campaign was noted, he became a Tsongas delegate and led more pro-business proposals at the 1992 Democratic convention. Johnson was a featured speaker at the convention.

Johnson ran for governor of Arizona in 1994, and though unsuccessful, won the endorsements of both of the state's major daily newspapers. He ran again in 1998 and won the state's Democratic primary, but lost the general election. While both Fife Symington and Johnson were bitter rivals in politics, they began to form a partnership after office, working together on several initiatives.

Johnson and the late U.S. Senator John McCain were often bitter enemies while Johnson was mayor, however, they built a strong friendship, and Johnson was chairman of an independent effort for McCain's 2008 presidential bid.

Johnson was a national leader focused on empowering independents in the electoral process, stopping legislative efforts from diminishing popular votes, and trying to remove dark money from political campaigns by opposing the US Supreme Court's landmark Citizens United v. FEC case.

Johnson was listed by The Arizona Republic as one of the top 16 people to watch in 2016. He focused on political reform through empowering independents in Arizona and throughout the nation. Johnson was a featured speaker at the National Conference for Independents. In 1994, Johnson ran an initiative to open primary elections in Arizona that resulted in a legislative measure that allowed independents to vote in primary elections. In 2011, Johnson ran an initiative to change the structure of primary elections that was stopped by the then Secretary of State. In 2016, he ran the effort to open up the elections for independents to participate and to force dark money founders to disclose their contributions. He and former Arizona Attorney General Terry Goddard teamed up to unite the two issues.

=== Redirect Health ===
After politics, Johnson has been an admired leader in business and civic leadership, being named as one of the state's most admired leaders by the Valley's leading business publication. Johnson, along with his son Justin Johnson, has focused on building homes for entry-level workforce housing, creating a counter-cyclical real estate fund during the 2008 downturn, and the creation of several technology companies. Johnson's largest effort has been in Redirect Health, a company focused on low wage workers and disrupting the current healthcare system.

Johnson is a co-founder of Redirect Health and has become an evangelist to lower healthcare costs. He notes that half of the American workers make less than $32,000 a year while family insurance plans can reach premium costs of $20,000 per year with individual insurance plans costing almost $7,000 a year. Small and mid-sized companies pass these costs on to employees through higher premiums and higher deductibles, making it difficult for these employees to get adequate healthcare. Johnson, in several publications, points out that almost 1/3 of the cost of healthcare could be eliminated by cutting administration, fraud, abuse, and overcharging. This idea was validated by healthcare professionals in the Harvard Business Review in 2015. Johnson advocates that the free-market approach is the only way to truly cut costs, enabling employers to buy their healthcare directly, bypassing large networks. Currently, Redirect Health is providing healthcare to low wage workers in all 50 states.

Johnson has been highlighted in BenefitsPro magazine, InBusiness, and Chief Executive. He has focused on the problems of the existing healthcare system and a major message of Revolutionizing Healthcare and providing an alternative to employer programs. His clear passion is trying to find a private-sector solution for lowering the cost of healthcare to give it greater accessibility to the working poor.

Party political offices
| Preceded by Eddie Basha | Democratic nominee for Governor of Arizona; 1998 | Succeeded by Janet Napolitano |
