= John B. Nelson =

American politician (born 1936)

John Nelson

Member of the Arizona Senate from the 12th district
- In office January 14, 2008 – January 14, 2013
- Preceded by: Robert Blendu
- Succeeded by: Andy Biggs

55th Mayor of Phoenix
- In office March 17, 1994 – March 28, 1994
- Preceded by: Paul Johnson
- Succeeded by: Skip Rimsza; Thelda Williams (interim)

Personal details
- Born: January 12, 1936 (age 90)
- Party: Republican
- Profession: Politician, Engineer

John B. Nelson (born January 12, 1936) is an American Republican politician, former city councilman of Phoenix, Arizona former member of the Arizona House of Representatives and a former member of the Arizona Senate. Nelson is a member of the Republican Party.

== 1983–1994 ==
In 1983, Nelson was elected to his first term as a council member representing what was then district 4 in Phoenix. In 1994, sitting mayor Paul Johnson had resigned from his office in accordance with Arizona law when he chose to run for the office of governor. As vice-mayor, Nelson assumed the position and duties of mayor for a short period between March 17 and March 28 of that year, until the council had selected an interim replacement in councilwoman Thelda Williams.

== 1999–2006 ==
Nelson won his fourth term on the city council as well as his third term as vice mayor in 1999. In 2000, however, he resigned his position in order to run for a seat in the state House of Representatives, winning his election and beginning his first term in the legislature in 2001 representing district 17. Following a redistricting, Nelson went on to win election in District 12 in 2002, where he and fellow representative Jerry Weires (as Arizona legislative districts are represented by 2 members) won reelection in 2004 and ran unopposed in 2006.

== 2008 ==
In 2008, Nelson successfully ran for the Arizona Senate in District 12.
