= Sam Mardian =

American politician (1919–2015)

48th Mayor of Phoenix
- In office January 4, 1960 – January 2, 1964
- Preceded by: Jack Williams
- Succeeded by: Milton H. Graham

Personal details
- Born: June 24, 1919 Pasadena, California, U.S.
- Died: November 23, 2015 (aged 96) Phoenix, Arizona, U.S.
- Party: Republican
- Spouse: Lucy Keshishian (m. 1942; died 2006)
- Profession: Politician

Samuel Mardian Jr. (June 24, 1919 – November 23, 2015) was an American businessman and politician.

Mardian was an American Republican politician, and the Mayor of Phoenix from 1960 until 1964.

== Biography ==
Mardian attended Southwestern University.

Mardian was born in Pasadena, California, the son of Armenian immigrants Akabe (née Lekerian) and Samuel Mardian Sr. He served as a captain in the United States Army Air Forces during World War II. From 1960 to 1964, Mardian served as the mayor of Phoenix, Arizona. Mardian was an older brother of Watergate figure Robert Mardian. He helped operate his family's construction enterprise and was an accountant.

Sam Mardian died in Phoenix, Arizona on November 23, 2015, at the age of 96.

== Awards and honors ==
- Distinguished Achievement Award, 1980, Arizona State University W. P. Carey School of Business
- Man of the Year, 1982, Valley Leadership
