= Thelda Williams =

American politician (1941–2023)

56th, 59th, and 61st Mayor of Phoenix Interim
- In office May 29, 2018 – March 21, 2019
- Preceded by: Greg Stanton
- Succeeded by: Kate Gallego
- In office December 31, 2011 – January 3, 2012
- Preceded by: Phil Gordon
- Succeeded by: Greg Stanton
- In office March 29, 1994 – November 3, 1994
- Preceded by: John B. Nelson
- Succeeded by: Skip Rimsza

Personal details
- Born: Thelda Marie Bender; June 30, 1941
- Died: November 14, 2023 (aged 82)
- Party: Republican

Thelda Marie Williams (née Bender; June 30, 1941 – November 14, 2023) was an American politician who served as a city councilor in Phoenix, Arizona, from 1985. She was appointed multiple times as interim Mayor of Phoenix.

== Biography ==
Williams, who had served on the Phoenix city council since 1989, was selected by the council to serve as an interim mayor of the city on March 29, 1994, following the resignation of former mayor Paul Johnson. Johnson, who was announcing his candidacy for the office of Governor of Arizona, was forced to resign his position due to state law prohibiting current officeholders from seeking another office except in the last year of their term. Coincidentally, Johnson had first been elevated to the office of mayor under similar circumstances when former mayor Terry Goddard had resigned his office to run for governor in 1990.

Williams chose not to seek election to the office of mayor during the 1994 special election, and resumed her duties as councilwoman on November 3, 1994. Williams chose to challenge the new incumbent Skip Rimsza for the office during the regular elections in 1995 but was defeated; having not run for reelection in her council seat, she left the city council in 1996. Williams ran for a new term in 2007 and was elected to a four-year term on the Phoenix city council on September 11, 2007. Williams was elected to another four-year term in 2011.

Williams was once again Phoenix's interim mayor following the resignation of Greg Stanton, who resigned in order to run successfully for U.S. Congress, on May 29, 2018. She did not declare for the ensuing special election.

Thelda Williams died from cancer on November 14, 2023, at the age of 82.
