= Jennifer Wright (lawyer) =

American lawyer and politician

- Occupations: Lawyer, politician
- Political party: Republican

Jennifer Wright is an American lawyer and politician who served as an assistant Arizona attorney general from 2019 to 2023. She headed the attorney general's election integrity unit.

== Career ==
Wright did computer programing work for the city of Phoenix, Arizona and served as a director of technology for a financial services broker dealer. She conducted policy research for the Goldwater Institute and the Institute for Justice. In 2010, she worked for U.S. representative J. D. Hayworth.

Wright was a Republican and Tea Party-affiliated candidate in the 2011 Phoenix mayoral election. Her candidacy was backed by the Arizona Freedom Alliance. She garnered 16,739 votes (11.85%) and fundraised approximately US$54,000 (equivalent to $77,286 in 2025). During the 2012 election, Wright was a ballot security supervisor and she co-chaired Verify the Vote Arizona which is associated with True the Vote. In 2014, she managed election day operations.

In August 2019, Wright joined the Attorney General's office as the assistant Arizona attorney general. She worked in the appeals and constitutional litigation division in the elections integrity unit. Her tweets during the 2022 Arizona elections generated controversy. Wright's resignation letter was received on December 31, 2022 and Wright's office was empty when the Mayes Administration arrived. On July 5, 2023, she submitted a US$2 million claim against the Attorney General's office and Kris Mayes for falsely claiming that Wright was terminated.

== Electoral history ==
2011 Phoenix mayoral election: First ballot, August 30, 2011
| Candidate | Votes | % |
|---|---|---|
| Greg Stanton | 53,553 | 37.90 |
| Wes Gullett | 29,020 | 20.54 |
| Peggy Neely | 17,984 | 12.73 |
| Claude Mattox | 16,842 | 11.92 |
| Jennifer Wright | 16,739 | 11.85 |
| Anna Brennan | 7,110 | 5.03 |
| write-ins | 52 | 0.04 |
| Total votes | 141,300 | 100.00 |
