= J. D. Mesnard =

American politician (born 1980)

J.D. Mesnard
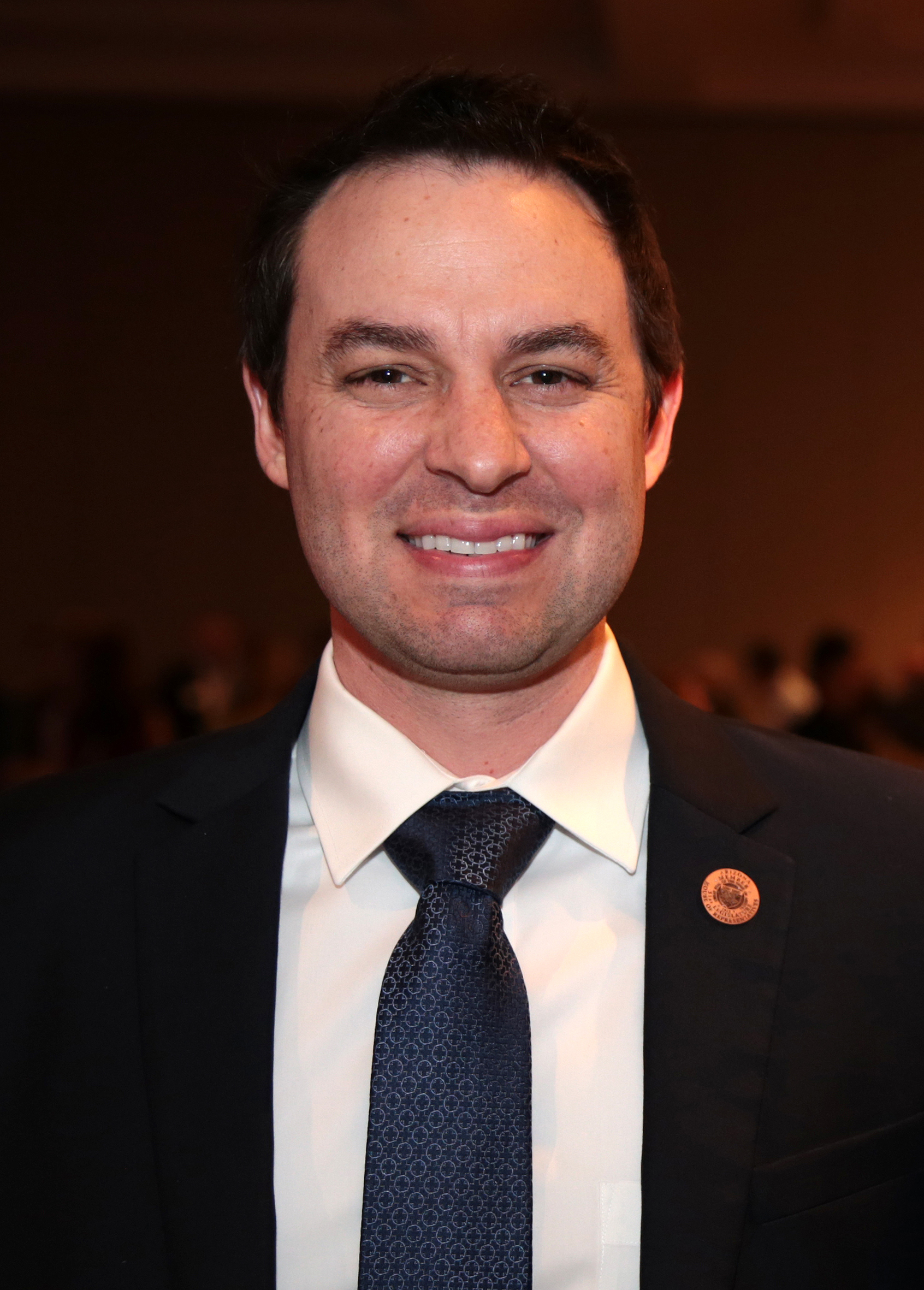
- Mesnard in 2017

Member of the Arizona Senate
- Incumbent
- Assumed office January 14, 2019
- Preceded by: Steve Yarbrough
- Succeeded by: Kristie O'Brien (elect)
- Constituency: 17th district (2019-2023); 13th district (2023-present)

53rd Speaker of the Arizona House of Representatives
- In office January 9, 2017 – January 14, 2019
- Preceded by: David Gowan
- Succeeded by: Russell Bowers

Member of the Arizona House of Representatives
- In office January 10, 2011 – January 14, 2019 Serving with Thomas Forese (2011–2015); Jeff Weninger (2015–2019)
- Preceded by: Rich Crandall
- Succeeded by: Jennifer Pawlik
- Constituency: 21st district (2011–2013); 17th district (2013–2019)

Personal details
- Born: May 15, 1980 (age 46) Tampa, Florida, U.S.
- Party: Republican

Javan Daniel "J. D." Mesnard (born May 15, 1980) is an American politician and a Republican member of the Arizona Senate representing District 13 since 2023. He previously represented District 17 from 2019 to 2023.

Mesnard spent eight years as a staffer for the Arizona Senate before being elected to the Arizona House of Representatives (where he was Speaker of the House for one term), from District 21 (Chandler, Gilbert, Sun Lakes, Mesa, Queen Creek) from 2011 to 2013, and then from District 17 (Chandler, Gilbert, Sun Lakes) from 2013 to 2019. Mesnard was elected to the state Senate in 2018, and took office in 2019.

== Education ==
Mesnard is on the adjunct faculty at Mesa Community College.

Mesnard earned his bachelor's degree in music composition from Arizona State University, his master's degree in business from University of Phoenix, and his master's in public administration from Keller Graduate School of Management (now DeVry University).

== Career ==
Prior to running for office, Mesnard spent eight years working at the Arizona Senate where he served as a policy advisor.

=== Arizona House of Representatives ===
Mesnard was elected to the Arizona House of Representatives in the 2010 elections, and took office in January 2011. He was Speaker Pro Tempore under Speaker Tobin from 2013 to 2014. He was Speaker of the House for the 2017–2018 term.

As House speaker, Mesnard was a key supporter of school voucher expansion legislation; the proposal passed the legislature, but a grassroots group collected enough signatures to refer the issue to voters. In November 2018, the voucher-expansion proposal (Proposition 305) was rejected by a large margin.

=== Arizona Senate ===
Mesnard was elected to the Arizona Senate in the 2018 elections, taking office in January 2019. He chairs the Senate Commerce Committee and previously chaired the Finance Committee.

In 2019, Mesnard introduced legislation to create the position of lieutenant governor of Arizona beginning in 2026. Arizona is one of a minority of states without the office; Arizona voters had previously rejected proposals to create the office in 1994 and 2010.

Mesnard voted against repealing Arizona's 1846 total ban on abortion.

=== Health care ===
Mesnard opposes the Affordable Care Act (Obamacare). He also opposes Medicaid expansion, which Arizona adopted in 2013. In 2015, Mesnard was among 36 current and former Republican lawmakers who filed an unsuccessful lawsuit seeking to overturn Arizona's Medicaid expansion on the grounds that an assessment imposed on hospitals was a tax that, under Proposition 108 (a ballot initiative passed in 1992), required the approval of a two-thirds majority of the Legislature. The lawsuit was unanimously rejected by the Arizona Supreme Court in a 2017 decision.

== Elections ==
- 2014: Mesnard and Jeff Weninger defeated Danielle Lee on November 4. (PDF) Mesnard received 30,018 votes.
- 2012: Redistricted to District 17 with fellow incumbent Representative Forese, and with incumbent Democratic Representatives Ed Ableser running for Arizona Senate and Ben Arredondo leaving the Legislature, Forese and Mesnard were unopposed for the August 28, 2012 Republican Primary; Forese placed first, and Mesnard placed second with 13,439 votes; Forese and Mesnard won the four-way November 6, 2012 General election, with Forese taking the first seat and Mesnard taking the second seat with 42,955 votes against Democratic nominee Karyn Lathan and a write-in candidate.
- 2010: When District 21 incumbent Republican Representative Steve Yarbrough ran for Arizona Senate and Warde Nichols left the Legislature, Mesnard ran in the three-way August 24, 2010 Republican Primary, placing second with 13,086 votes; in the three-way November 2, 2010 General election, Thomas Forese took the first seat, and Mesnard took the second seat with 39,891 votes against Green candidate Linda Macias.

Arizona House of Representatives
Preceded by Rich Crandall	Member of the Arizona House of Representatives from the 21st district 2011–2013; Served alongside: Thomas Forese	Succeeded by Debbie Lesko
Preceded by Ed Ableser	Member of the Arizona House of Representatives from the 17th district 2013–2019; Served alongside: Jeff Weninger	Succeeded by Jennifer Pawlik
Arizona Senate
Preceded by Steve Yarbrough	Member of the Arizona Senate from the 17th district 2019–present	Incumbent
Political offices
Preceded by David Gowan	Speaker of the Arizona House of Representatives; 2017–2019	Succeeded by Russell Bowers
