= Arizona's 13th legislative district =

American legislative district

- Map of District 13: Approved January 21, 2022
- Senator: J. D. Mesnard (R)
- House members: Jeff Weninger (R); Julie Willoughby (R)
- Registration: 36.24% Republican; 27.23% Democratic; 34.96% Other
- Demographics: 56% White; 6% Black/African American; 2% Native American; 13% Asian; 21% Hispanic
- Population: 237,866
- Voting-age population: 182,046
- Registered voters: 141,334

Arizona's 13th legislative district is one of 30 in the state, consisting of a section of Maricopa County. As of 2023, there are 45 precincts in the district, all in Maricopa, with a total registered voter population of 141,334. The district has an overall population of 237,866.

Following the 2020 United States redistricting cycle, the Arizona Independent Redistricting Commission (AIRC) redrew legislative district boundaries in Arizona. According to the AIRC, the district is highly competitive politically.

== Political representation ==
The district is represented in the 56th Arizona State Legislature, which convenes from January 1, 2023, to December 31, 2024, by J. D. Mesnard (R-Chandler) in the Arizona Senate and by Jennifer Pawlik (D-Chandler) and Julie Willoughby (R-Chandler) in the Arizona House of Representatives.

Representative Julie Willoughby was appointed to the House after Republican Representative Liz Harris was expelled. Harris' expulsion occurred on April 12, 2023.

Name	Image	Residence	Office	Party
J. D. Mesnard		Chandler	State senator	Republican
Jeff Weninger		Chandler	State representative	Republican
Julie Willoughby		Chandler	State representative	Republican

== Election results ==
The 2022 elections were the first in the newly drawn district.

=== Arizona Senate ===
2022 Arizona's 13th Senate district election
Party	Candidate	Votes	%
Republican	J. D. Mesnard (incumbent)	48,590	51.73
Democratic	Cindy Hans	45,340	48.27
Total votes		93,930	100
Republican hold			

=== Arizona House of Representatives ===
2022 Arizona House of Representatives election, 13th district
Party	Candidate	Votes	%
Democratic	Jennifer Pawlik (incumbent)	47,164	35.05
Republican	Liz Harris	43,830	32.58
Republican	Julie Willoughby	43,555	32.37
Total votes		134,549	100.00
Democratic hold			
Republican hold			

== See also ==
- List of Arizona legislative districts
- Arizona State Legislature
