= Jennifer Pawlik =

American politician

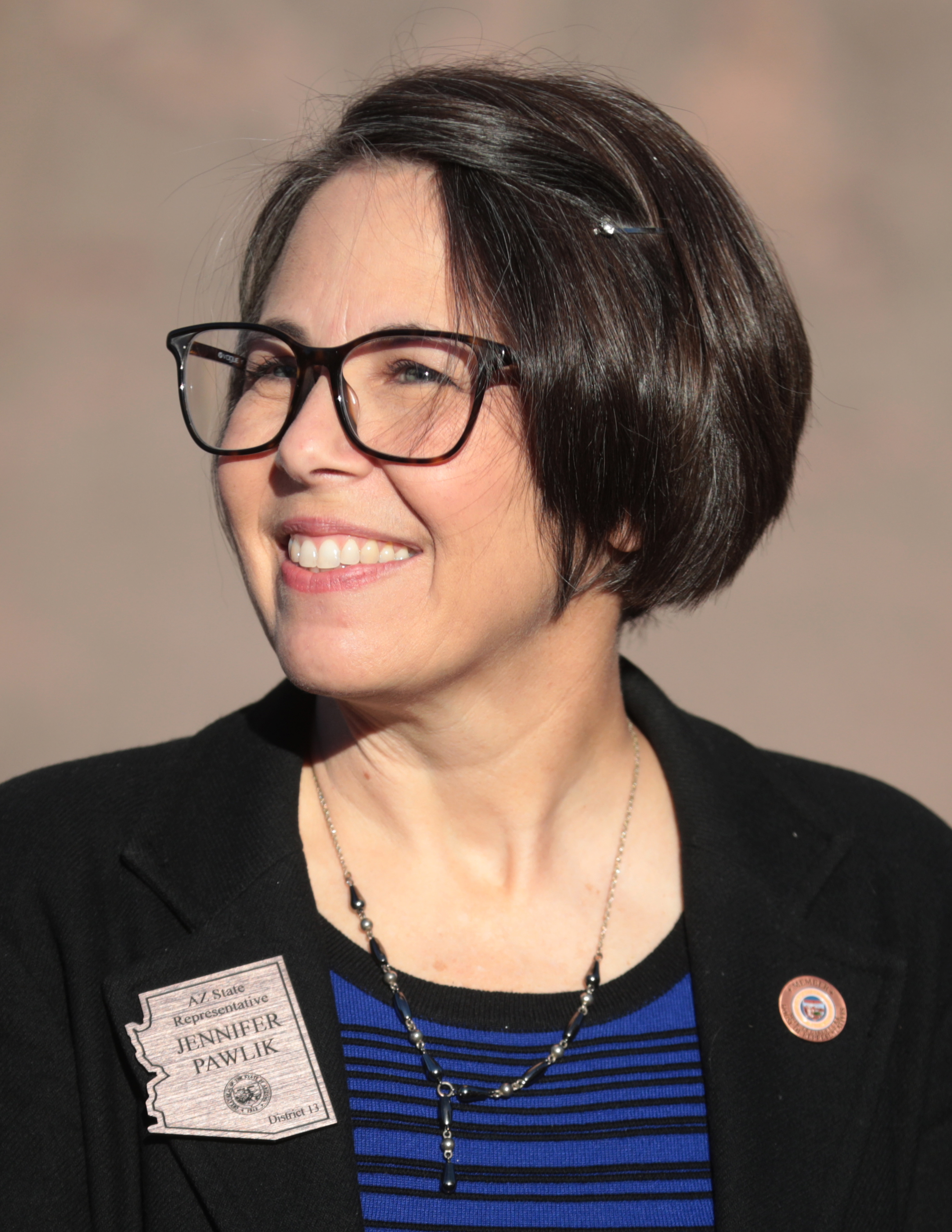
- Pawlik in 2023

Member of the Arizona House of Representatives
- In office January 9, 2023 – January 13, 2025 Serving with Jeff Weninger (2019–2023); Julie Willoughby (2023–2025)
- Preceded by: J. D. Mesnard
- Succeeded by: Jeff Weninger
- Constituency: 17th district (2019–2023); 13th district (2023–2025)

Personal details
- Party: Democratic

Jennifer Pawlik is an American politician and a Democratic former member of the Arizona House of Representatives representing District 13 from 2023 to 2025. She previously represented District 17 from 2019 to 2023. Pawlik was elected in 2018 to succeed retiring State Representative J. D. Mesnard, who instead ran for State Senate. Pawlik defeated Mesnard's mother, Nora Ellen, in the general election on November 6, 2018.

Pawlik graduated from Northern Arizona University, and was a teacher in the Chandler Unified School District prior to being elected to the state legislature.
