= Skip Rimsza =

American politician

57th Mayor of Phoenix
- In office November 4, 1994 – November 2, 2004
- Preceded by: Paul Johnson; John B. Nelson (acting); Thelda Williams (interim)
- Succeeded by: Phil Gordon

Personal details
- Born: Anton Rimsza; March 31, 1955 (age 71) Chicago, Illinois, U.S.
- Party: Republican
- Profession: Politician

Anton "Skip" Rimsza (born March 31, 1955) is an American politician and was the mayor of Phoenix, Arizona, from 1994 to 2004.

== Biography ==
Skip Rimsza was born March 31, 1955, in Chicago, Illinois. His parents were Anton Vincent Rimsza and Elizabeth Marie Rimsza, born Kenny. He was the 4th of 8 children. His family moved to Phoenix shortly after his birth. He attended Camelback High School and Phoenix College. He worked as a realtor in his father's company Tony Rimsza Realty prior to his election as mayor. Skip is an avid hunter and fisherman. He has 5 children: Brian, Jennifer, Nicole, Taylor and Alex. He was sworn in as mayor on November 4, 1994, following a special election held on October 25 to replace outgoing interim mayor Thelda Williams. Rimsza won reelection to a full term the following year during normal elections on October 3, and a second term on September 7, 1999. Limited to two full terms, Rimsza left office on January 2, 2004.
