= Jeff Weninger =

American politician

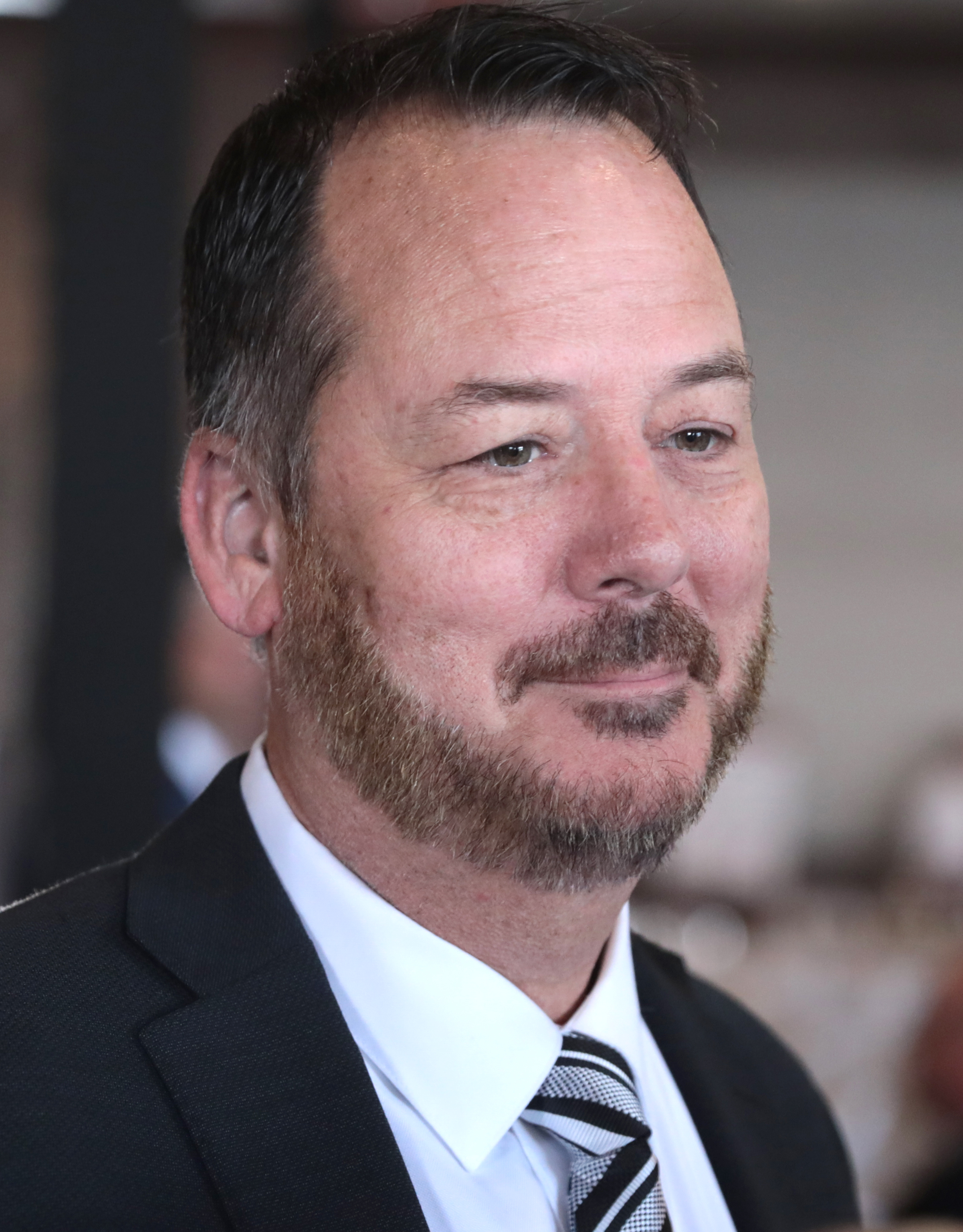
- Weninger in 2022

Member of the Arizona House of Representatives
- Incumbent
- Assumed office January 13, 2025 Serving with Julie Willoughby
- Preceded by: Jennifer Pawlik
- Succeeded by: Racquel Armstrong (elect)
- Constituency: 13th district
- In office January 5, 2015 – January 9, 2023 Serving with Jennifer Pawlik
- Preceded by: Thomas Forese
- Succeeded by: Rachel Jones
- Constituency: 17th district

Personal details
- Born: March 10, 1970 (age 56) Wichita, Kansas, U.S.
- Party: Republican
- Spouse: Janet Weninger
- Children: 3
- Profession: Restaurant Owner
- Website: jeffweninger.com

Jeff Weninger (born March 10, 1970) is an American politician and a Republican member of the Arizona House of Representatives representing District 13 since 2025. He previously represented District 17 from 2015 to 2023. Before serving in the legislature, Weninger served on the Chandler City Council for eight years and held the position of Vice Mayor. He was a candidate for State Treasurer of Arizona in the 2022 election, but lost the primary to incumbent Treasurer Kimberly Yee.

== Elections ==
- 2014 – Weninger and J.D. Mesnard defeated Danielle Lee on November 4. Weninger received 32,297 votes
