= Greg Stanton =

American lawyer and politician (born 1970)

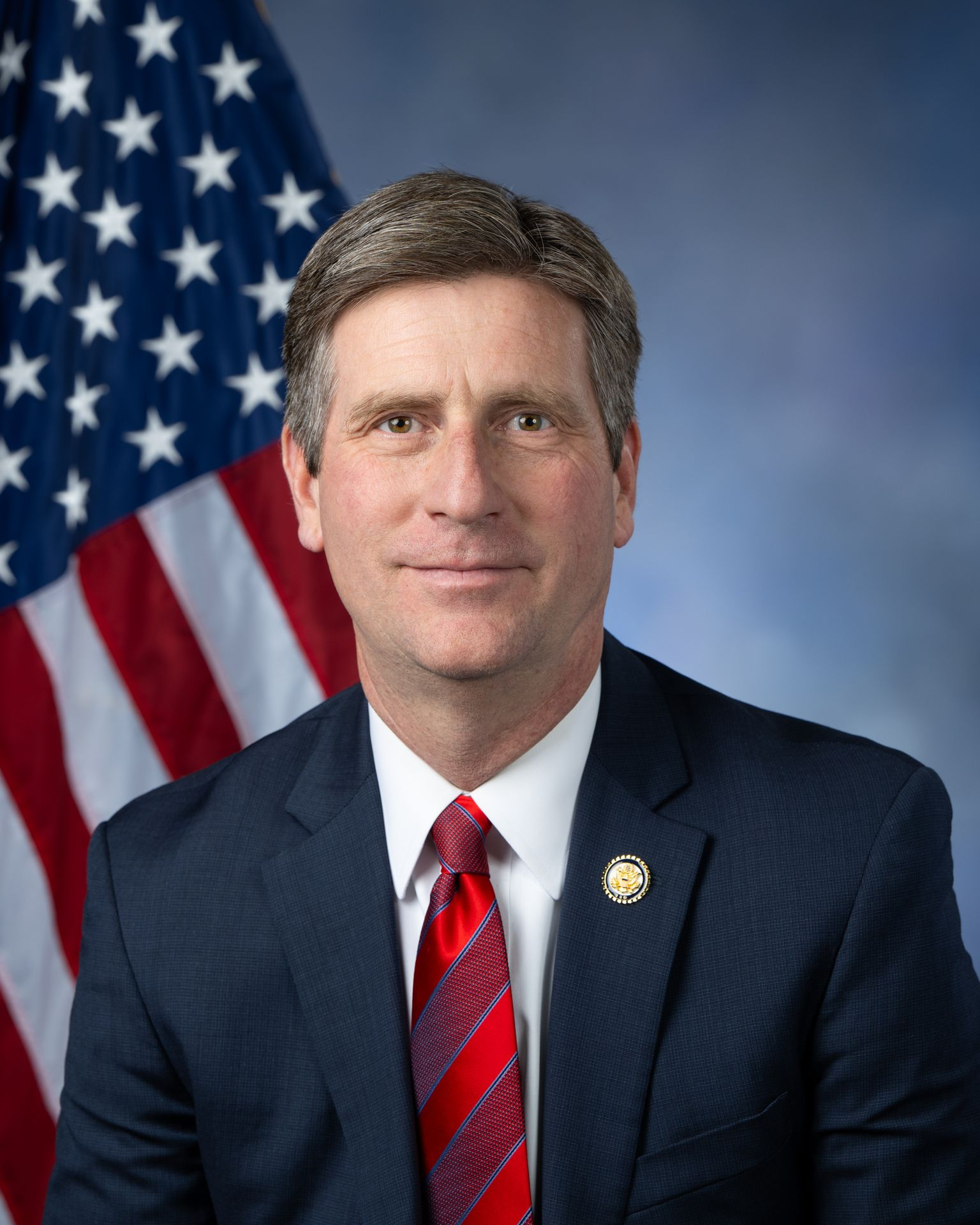
- Official portrait, 2025

Member of the U.S. House of Representatives from Arizona
- Incumbent
- Assumed office January 3, 2019
- Preceded by: Kyrsten Sinema
- Constituency: 9th district (2019–2023); 4th district (2023–present)

60th Mayor of Phoenix
- In office January 3, 2012 – May 29, 2018
- Preceded by: Phil Gordon; Thelda Williams (interim)
- Succeeded by: Kate Gallego; Thelda Williams (interim)

Personal details
- Born: Gregory John Stanton; March 8, 1970 (age 56) Long Island, New York, U.S.
- Party: Democratic
- Spouse: Nicole Stanton (m. 2005)
- Children: 2
- Education: Marquette University (BA); University of Michigan (JD)
- Website: House website Campaign website

Gregory John Stanton (born March 8, 1970) is an American lawyer and politician who is the U.S. representative from Arizona's 4th congressional district, serving since 2019. A Democrat, he was previously mayor of Phoenix from 2012 to 2018, and was on the Phoenix City Council from 2000 until 2009.

Stanton was elected mayor in 2011 and reelected in 2015. He was first elected to Congress in 2018, and was re-elected in 2020, 2022, and 2024.

== Early life, education, and career ==
Stanton was born on Long Island, New York. His family moved to Arizona and he graduated from Cortez High School in west Phoenix in 1988. He then attended Marquette University and graduated magna cum laude with a B.A. in history and political science in 1992 and was a member of Phi Beta Kappa. In 1995, Stanton earned his J.D. from the University of Michigan Law School. He then worked as an education attorney from 1995 to 2000. In 2014, Stanton became an adjunct professor at Arizona Summit Law School.

== Early political career ==
=== Phoenix City Council ===
Stanton was elected to the Phoenix City Council for 6th district in 2000, 2001, and 2005 and served until 2009. This district included the affluent Phoenix Biltmore Area centered around the Biltmore Fashion Park and Arcadia areas, as well as non-contiguous Ahwatukee.

=== State Attorney General's Office ===
From 2009 to 2011, Stanton served as Deputy Attorney General of Arizona, under Attorney General Terry Goddard.

He helped cut off funding for the cartels who were trafficking people and drugs, fought against the predatory payday lending industry, helped to eliminating mortgage fraud and negotiated a settlement to protect the future of Luke Air Force Base.

=== Mayor of Phoenix ===
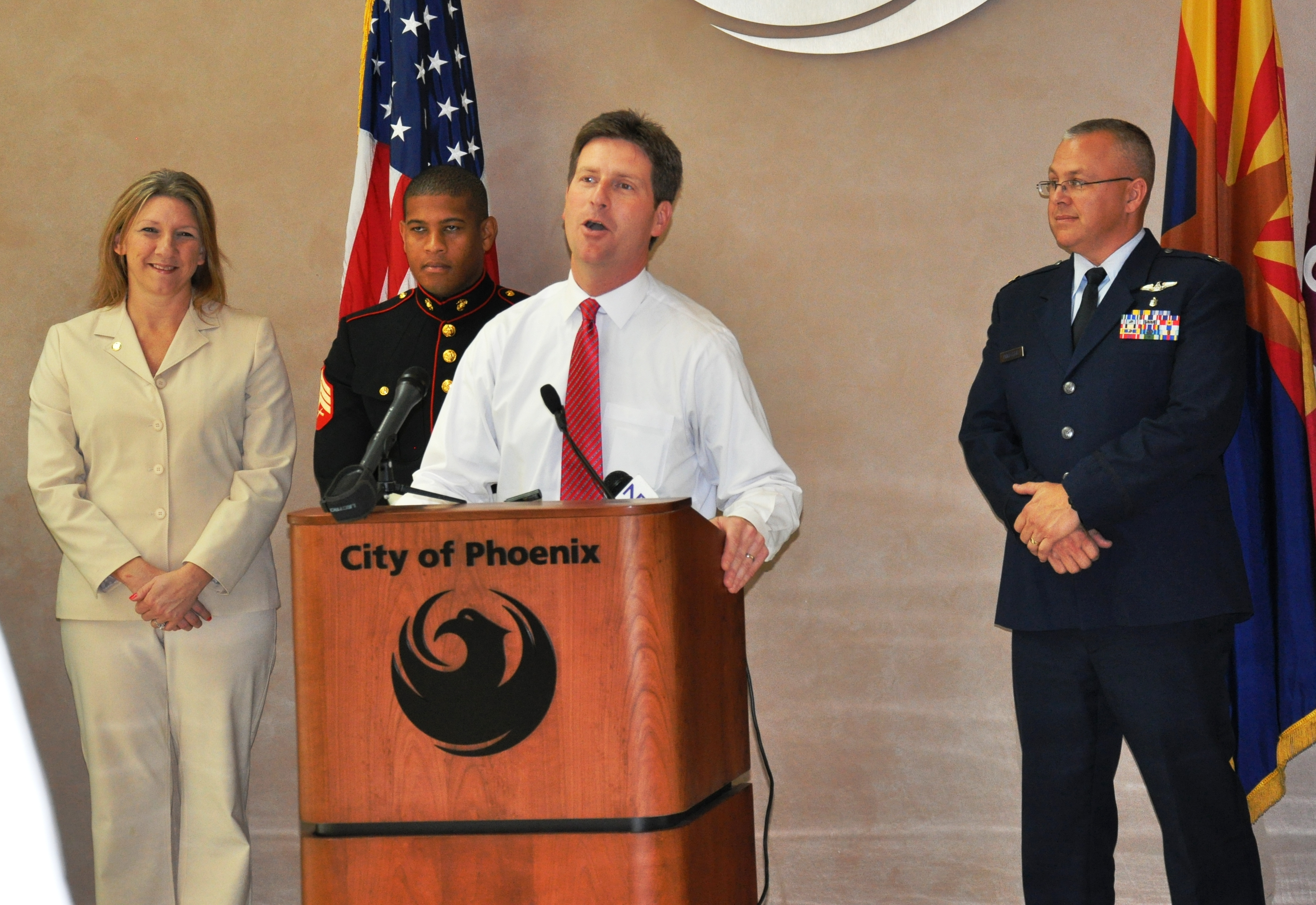
Greg Stanton briefs reporters at a press conference at City Hall.

Stanton was mayor of Phoenix from 2012 to 2018. During his 2011 campaign for mayor, questions arose over the legality of nearly $70,000 in contributions from Stanton's former treasurer Mindy Shields. Stanton opposed the embezzlement prosecution of Shields and fired her in October 2010.

On August 30, 2011, Stanton and Republican candidate Wes Gullett were the top two candidates in the Phoenix mayoral primary, with Stanton getting about 38% of the vote and Gullett 20%.

Stanton advocated against the 2013 federal budget sequestration by meeting with members of Congress multiple times.

Stanton was reelected on August 25, 2015. In 2017, Governing magazine named Stanton one of its Public Officials of the Year for his efforts to expand light rail, bike lanes, and sidewalks while reducing the city's greenhouse gas emissions. Stanton resigned on May 29, 2018, to run for Congress.

== U.S. House of Representatives ==
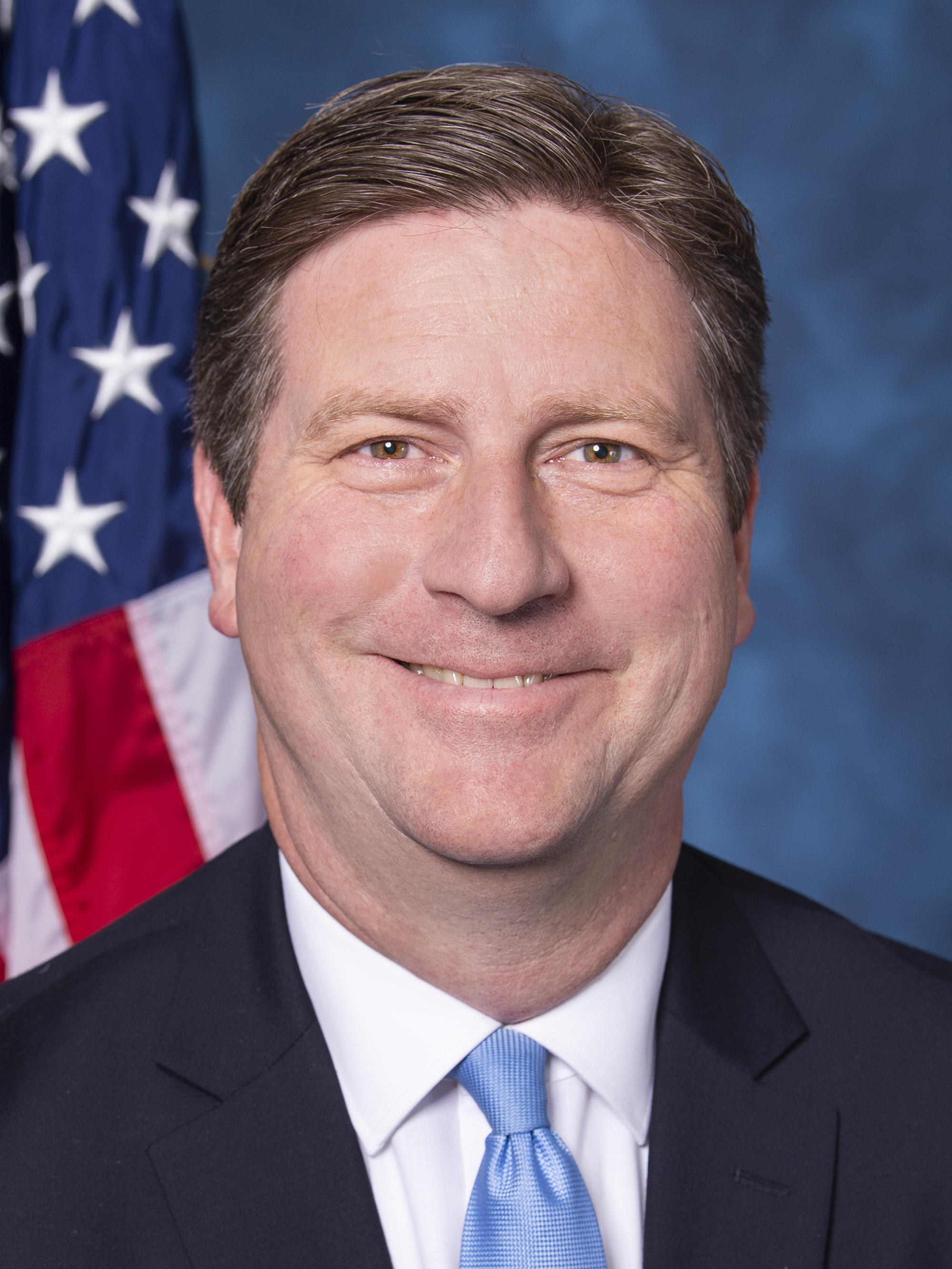
Official portrait, 116th Congress

=== Elections ===
==== 2018 ====
After incumbent Representative Kyrsten Sinema decided to run for the U.S. Senate in 2018, to replace retiring U.S. Senator Jeff Flake, Stanton – who was term-limited as mayor – decided to run for Sinema's seat. He was unopposed in the Democratic primary, and defeated Republican nominee Steve Ferrara 61% to 39% after a campaign during which he stressed his problem-solving experience as mayor.

==== 2020 ====
In 2020, Stanton was unopposed in the Democratic primary and defeated Republican nominee Dave Giles in the general election with 61% of the vote.

==== 2022 ====
Stanton ran for reelection in Arizona's 4th congressional district after redistricting and defeated Republican nominee Kelly Cooper in the general election with 56% of the vote.

=== Committee assignments ===
For the 119th Congress:

- Committee on Foreign Affairs
  - Subcommittee on Western Hemisphere
- Committee on Transportation and Infrastructure
  - Subcommittee on Aviation
  - Subcommittee on Highways and Transit
  - Subcommittee on Economic Development, Public Buildings and Emergency Management (ranking member)
- Select Committee on the Strategic Competition Between the United States and the Chinese Communist Party

=== Caucus memberships ===
- New Democrat Coalition
  - Chair of the Immigration Task Force
- Black Maternal Health Caucus
- Congressional Equality Caucus

== Political positions ==
Stanton speaking in Phoenix, Arizona in 2017

In an interview a few weeks after the November 2011 mayoral election, Stanton stated his support for repealing the city food tax. He also supported public pension reforms, including more employee contributions to their retirement funds and longer work experience before retirement benefits. In March 2013, Stanton decided against repealing the food tax due to projections that ending the tax would cause layoffs of nearly 99 police officers and 300 other city employees.

As a Representative, Stanton supported the Equality Act, a bill that would expand the federal Civil Rights Act of 1964 to ban discrimination based on sexual orientation and gender identity.

On October 1, 2020, Stanton co-signed a letter to Secretary of State Mike Pompeo that condemned Azerbaijan's offensive operations against the Armenian-populated enclave of Nagorno-Karabakh, denounced Turkey's role in the Nagorno-Karabakh conflict, and called for an immediate ceasefire.

Stanton opposed the 2022 overturning of Roe v. Wade, calling it "a dark, dark day for our country" and saying the Supreme Court had an "extreme, ideological agenda".

On July 11, 2024, Stanton called for Joe Biden to withdraw from the 2024 United States presidential election.

== Electoral history ==
Arizona's 9th congressional district, 2018
Party	Candidate	Votes	%
Democratic	Greg Stanton	159,583	61.09%
Republican	Steve Ferrara	101,662	38.91%
Total votes		261,245	100%
Democratic hold			

Arizona's 9th congressional district, 2020
Party	Candidate	Votes	%
Democratic	Greg Stanton (incumbent)	217,094	61.06%
Republican	Dave Giles	135,180	38.04%
Total votes		352,274	100%
Democratic hold			

Arizona's 4th congressional district, 2022
Party	Candidate	Votes	%
Democratic	Greg Stanton (incumbent)	148,941	56.01%
Republican	Kelly Cooper	116,521	43.09%
Independent	Stephan Jones (write-in)	36	0.01%
Total votes		265,498	100%
Democratic hold			

Arizona's 4th congressional district, 2024
Party	Candidate	Votes	%
Democratic	Greg Stanton (incumbent)	176,428	52.74%
Republican	Kelly Cooper	152,052	45.45%
Green	Vincent Beck-Jones	6,065	1.81%
Total votes		334,545	100%
Democratic hold			

Arizona's 4th congressional district, 2026
Primary election
Party	Candidate	Votes	%
Democratic	Greg Stanton (incumbent)	35,551	62.27%
Democratic	Kai Newkirk	21,533	37.73%
Total votes		57,084	100%

== Personal life ==
Stanton is married to Nicole Stanton, an attorney for a cannabis company. They married in 2005 and have two children. They separated in 2016 but were back together by 2019. Stanton is Catholic.

Political offices
Preceded by Phil Gordon	Mayor of Phoenix; 2012–2018	Succeeded by Thelda Williams
U.S. House of Representatives
Preceded by Kyrsten Sinema	Member of the U.S. House of Representatives from Arizona's 9th congressional district 2019–2023	Succeeded by Paul Gosar
Preceded by Paul Gosar	Member of the U.S. House of Representatives from Arizona's 4th congressional district 2023–present	Incumbent
U.S. order of precedence (ceremonial)
Preceded by Kim Schrier	United States representatives by seniority 225th	Succeeded by Pete Stauber
