= Phil Gordon (politician) =

American politician (born 1951)

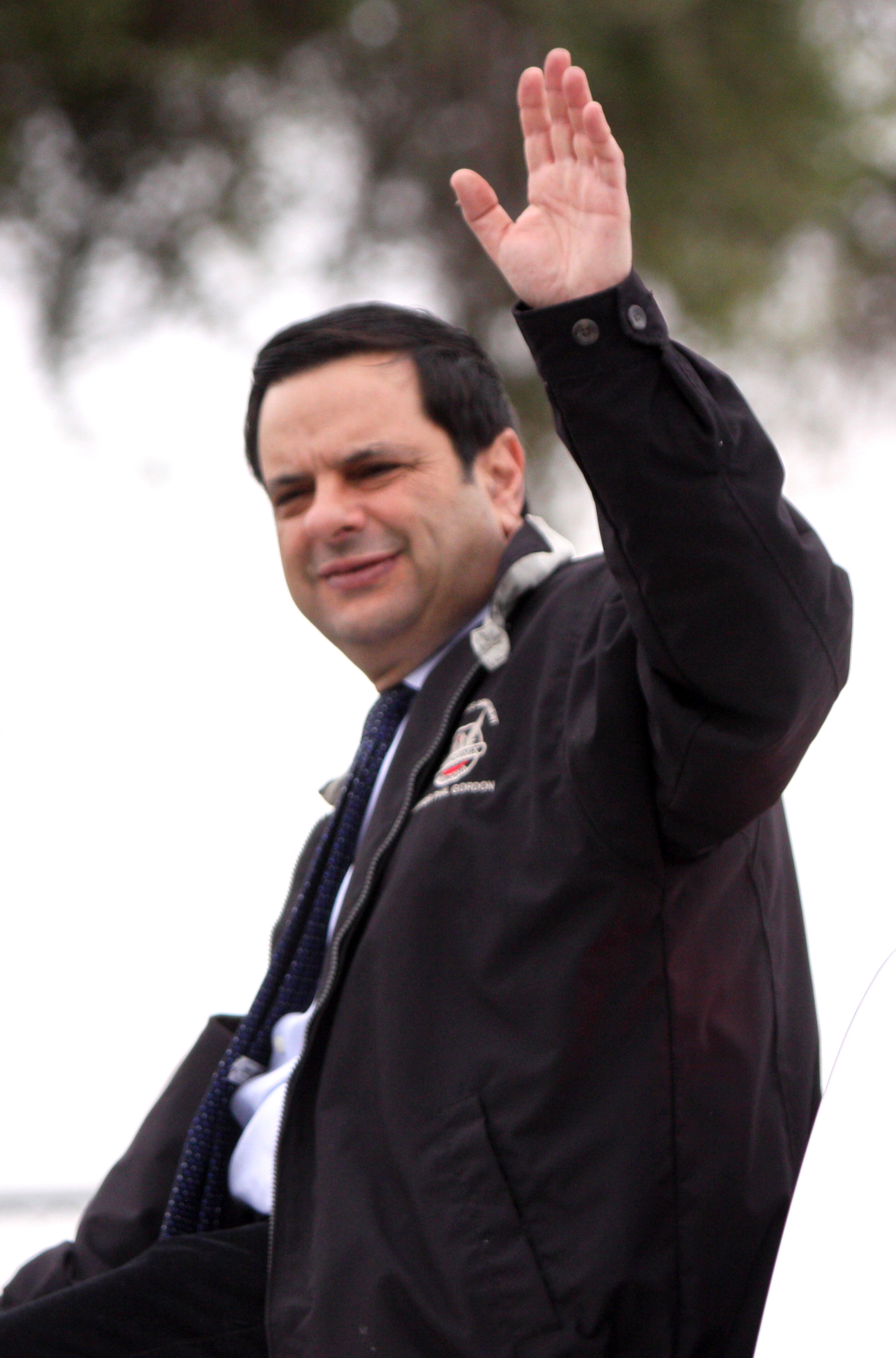

58th Mayor of Phoenix
- In office January 2, 2004 – January 2, 2012
- Preceded by: Skip Rimsza
- Succeeded by: Greg Stanton; Thelda Williams (interim)

Phoenix City Council
- In office January 5, 1997 – October 30, 2004

Personal details
- Born: April 18, 1951 (age 75) Chicago, Illinois, U.S.
- Party: Democratic
- Education: University of Arizona; Arizona State University

Phil Gordon (born April 18, 1951) is an American politician who served as the 58th mayor of Phoenix, Arizona, from 2004 to 2012 and a member of the Phoenix City Council. Gordon is a member of the Democratic Party.

== Early life, education, and early career ==
Born to Sidney and Judy Gordon, he is the oldest of three children and the grandson of a Lithuanian Jewish immigrant. In 1960, the Gordon family moved to Phoenix, where Phil attended Madison Meadows Elementary and Middle School and Central High School. He attended the University of Arizona and graduated with a bachelor's degree in education. After earning his undergraduate degree, Gordon entered Arizona State University Law.

Gordon has had worked in a variety of professions, including as a school teacher, a lawyer, a business owner, and a chairman of Landiscor Aerial Photography Company, as well serving on the Madison School Board.

After serving as chief of staff to a former Phoenix Mayor in 1996, Gordon's interest in Phoenix became his incentive to seek public office. Pledging to fight crime and preserve neighborhoods, he entered the race for Phoenix City Council and was elected in 1997 and 2001.

== Mayoralty ==
The former city councilman was elected mayor in the non-partisan mayoral race on September 9, 2003, garnering 72 percent of the vote. He took office on January 2, 2004. He was re-elected on September 11, 2007, with 77 percent of the vote.

During his tenure at Phoenix City Hall, Gordon has focused heavily on revitalizing downtown Phoenix. He and other members of the Phoenix City Council have put more than $1 billion into the city's core, investing in projects such as the revitalization of the Phoenix Convention Center, the construction of a new $350 million Sheraton hotel, and the creation of a downtown Arizona State University campus.

During the 2004 campaign for Maricopa County Attorney, Gordon endorsed Republican nominee Andrew Thomas who would later be disbarred from the practice of law in Arizona for "unfounded and malicious criminal and civil charges against political opponents, including four state judges and the state attorney general."

Gordon has also been a staunch backer of a $1.1 billion multi-modal transportation system which was approved by 65 percent of Phoenix voters in March 2000. The Mayor has engaged in a verbal dispute with Maricopa County Sheriff Joe Arpaio over issues related to illegal immigration, opposing the controversial Arizona SB 1070 law, which he has considered to be racist and poorly drawn.

In 2008, a group calling itself American Citizens United set up a petition to recall Gordon from office. The group faltered and did not submit any signatures.

Additionally, President George W. Bush appointed Gordon to serve on the Honorary Delegation to accompany him to Jerusalem for the celebration of the 60th anniversary of the State of Israel in May 2008.

== See also ==
- List of mayors of Phoenix
- Timeline of Phoenix, Arizona, 2000s-2010s
