= List of mayors of Phoenix =

The following is a list of the mayors of Phoenix, Arizona.

#	Portrait	Mayor	Term	Notes and references
1		John T. Alsap	1881	
2		Francis A. Shaw	1881–1883	
3		DeForest Porter	1883–1884	
4		George F. Coats	1884–1885	
5		Emil Ganz	1885–1886	First Jewish mayor
6		DeForest Porter (2nd)	1886–1888	
7		A. Leonard Meyer	1888–1889	
8		George F. Coats (2nd)	1889–1890	
9		T. D. McGlasson	1890–1891	
10		Joseph Campbell	1891–1893	
11		P. J. Cole	1893–1894	
12		James D. Monihon	1894–1895	
13		R. L. Rosson	1895–1896	
14		R. Allyn Lewis	1896	
15		Frank B. Moss	1896	
16		James D. Monihon (2nd)	1896–1897	
17		John C. Adams	1897–1899	
18		Czar James Dyer	1899	
19		Emil Ganz (2nd)	1899–1901	
20		Walter Talbot	1901–1903	
21		Walter Bennett	1903–1904	
22		John T. Dunlap	1904–1905	
23		John C. Adams (2nd)	1905	
24		Frank B. Moss (2nd)	1905–1906 (died in office)	
25		R. H. Greene	1906	
26		Lewis W. Coggins	1906–1909	
27		Lloyd B. Christy	1909–1914	
28		George U. Young	1914–1916	
29		Peter Corpstein	1916–1920	
30		Willis H. Plunkett	1920–1922	
31		L. L. Harmon	1922–1923	
32		Louis B. Whitney	1923–1925	
33		Frank A. Jefferson	1925–1928	
34		Fred J. Paddock	1928–1930	
35		Franklin D. Lane	1930–1932	
36		Fred J. Paddock (2nd)	1932–1934	
37		Joseph S. Jenckes	1934–1936	
38		John Hunt Udall	1936–1938	
39		Walter J. Thalheimer	1938–1940	
40		Reed Shupe	1940–1942	
41		Newell Stewart	1942–1944	
42		J. H. Fleming	1944–1946	
43		Ray Busey	1946–1948	
44		John Nicholas Udall	1948–1952	
45		Hohen Foster	1952–1954	
46		Frank G. Murphy	1954–1956	
47		Jack Williams	1956–1960	
48		Sam Mardian	1960–1964	
49		Milton H. Graham	1964–1970	
50		John D. Driggs	1970–1974	
51		Timothy A. Barrow	1974–1976	
52		Margaret Hance	1976–1984	First woman mayor
53		Terry Goddard	1984–1990	
54		Paul Johnson	1990–1994	
55		John B. Nelson (fill-in)	1994	
56		Thelda Williams (interim)	1994	
57		Skip Rimsza	1994–2004	
58		Phil Gordon	2004–2012	2nd Jewish mayor of Phoenix
59		Thelda Williams (interim)	2012	
60		Greg Stanton	2012–2018	
61		Thelda Williams (interim)	2018–2019	
62		Kate Gallego	2019–present	Elected 2019; First female Jewish mayor of Phoenix

== See also ==
- List of mayors of the 50 largest cities in the United States
