= Jane Dee Hull =

Governor of Arizona from 1997 to 2003

Jane Hull
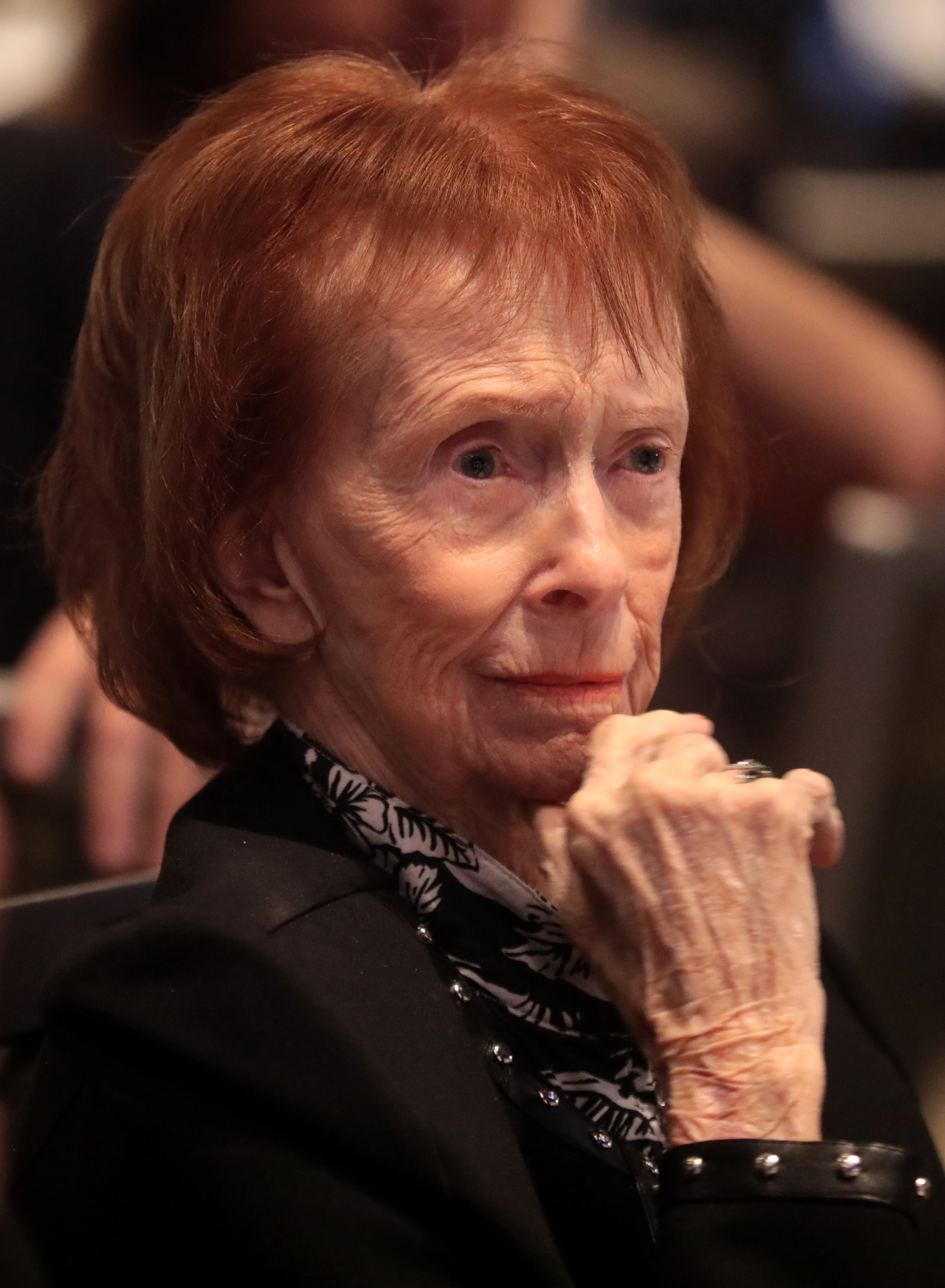
- Hull in 2019

20th Governor of Arizona
- In office September 5, 1997 – January 6, 2003
- Preceded by: Fife Symington
- Succeeded by: Janet Napolitano

16th Secretary of State of Arizona
- In office January 2, 1995 – September 5, 1997
- Governor: Fife Symington
- Preceded by: Richard Mahoney
- Succeeded by: Betsey Bayless

43rd Speaker of the Arizona House of Representatives
- In office January 2, 1989 – July 1992
- Preceded by: Joe Lane
- Succeeded by: Mark Killian

Member of the Arizona House of Representatives from the 18th district
- In office January 1, 1983 – October 4, 1993 Serving with Burton S. Barr, George E. Weisz, Susan Gerard
- Preceded by: Pete Dunn
- Succeeded by: Barry Wong

Member of the Arizona House of Representatives from the 19th district
- In office January 1, 1979 – January 1, 1983 Serving with W. A. "Tony" West Jr.
- Preceded by: Stan Akers
- Succeeded by: Jan Brewer; Nancy Wessel

Personal details
- Born: Jane Dee Bowersock; August 8, 1935 Kansas City, Missouri, U.S.
- Died: April 16, 2020 (aged 84) Phoenix, Arizona, U.S.
- Party: Republican
- Spouse: Terry Hull (m. 1954; died 2020)
- Children: 4
- Education: University of Kansas (BA); Arizona State University, Tempe (JD)

Jane Dee Hull (née Bowersock; August 8, 1935 – April 16, 2020) was an American politician and educator. She was the 20th governor of Arizona, serving from 1997 to 2003. She ascended to the office following the resignation of Fife Symington; Hull was elected in her own right in the 1998 Arizona gubernatorial election over Paul Johnson and served one term before being constitutionally term-limited in 2002, succeeded by Janet Napolitano. She was the first woman formally elected as Governor of Arizona, and the second woman to serve in the office, after Rose Mofford. She was a member of the Republican Party.

Prior to becoming governor, she was also a member of the Arizona House of Representatives, House Majority Whip, Speaker of the House, and Secretary of State of Arizona, becoming the first Republican to hold the office in more than six decades.

== Early life and career ==
Hull was born Jane Dee Bowersock in Kansas City, Missouri, the daughter of Mildred (Swenson) and Justin Bowersock, an editor of The Kansas City Star newspaper. Hull graduated from the University of Kansas with a degree in education. She taught elementary school in Kansas, and her husband, Terry, studied to become an obstetrician.

She moved to Arizona in 1962 with her husband, where he began working with the Navajo Nation while she raised the couple's four children and taught English. The family then relocated to Phoenix.

After hearing a Barry Goldwater speech, Hull campaigned for him in the 1964 United States presidential election.

== Legislative career ==
Hull entered politics in 1978 and was elected to the Arizona House of Representatives as a Republican. She served for seven terms, including two terms as Speaker of the House, being the first female speaker in Arizona history. In 1991, while she was speaker, the Arizona legislature experienced a major political scandal called AZSCAM, which resulted in the resignation or removal of ten members of the House and Senate. As a result, Speaker Hull instituted a number of ethics reforms to reestablish public confidence in the legislature.

Politically, On The Issues, a non-profit and non-partisan organization which records politicians' stances on issues, considered Hull to have been a centrist or moderate Republican. Her record was considered to be fiscally conservative and socially moderate.

== Governor of Arizona ==
=== First term (1997–1999) ===
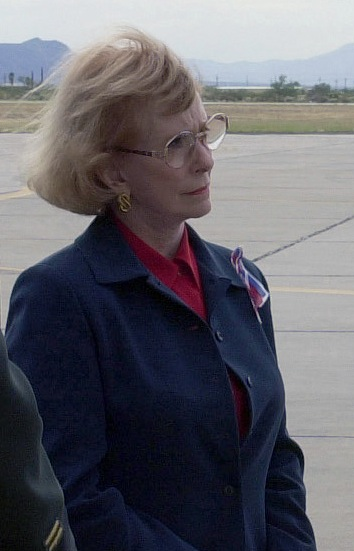
Then-Governor Hull during a visit to the Air National Guard's alert detachment facility.

Hull was elected Arizona Secretary of State in 1994. After Governor Fife Symington was forced to resign due to a felony conviction, Hull became governor on September 5, 1997. She was sworn in by U.S. Supreme Court Justice Sandra Day O'Connor, herself a former Arizona legislator. Arizona has no lieutenant governor, so the secretary of state, if holding office by election, stands first in the line of succession.

=== 1998 gubernatorial campaign ===
Hull was elected Governor in 1998 over former Mayor of Phoenix Paul Johnson, in a landslide election. This election was particularly significant because it was the first time in the history of the United States that all five of the top elected executive offices in one state were held by women: Hull; Betsey Bayless, secretary of state; Janet Napolitano, attorney general; Carol Springer, treasurer; and Lisa Graham Keegan, Superintendent of Public Instruction.

=== Second term (1999–2003) ===
While she was governor, Hull's relations with home state U.S. Senator John McCain were strained. During the 2000 Presidential primary season she endorsed his opponent, Texas Governor George W. Bush, in the Arizona primary.

Hull is known for having signed into law the bill that resulted in the "alt-fuels" scandal of 2000. The resulting law promised car buyers up to 60 percent off new vehicles if they were converted to run on alternative fuels like propane or natural gas, yet it did not properly cap the number of buyers eligible for the program nor did it require buyers to use the new fuels. Instead of the $10 million the program was supposed to cost, it ended up costing Arizona $200 million before lawmakers changed the rules.

Hull presided over the execution of Walter LaGrand, over the first ever recommendation of a stay from the Arizona clemency board.

== Post-governorship ==
Hull was constitutionally barred from running for a second full term in 2002 (the Arizona constitution limits the Governor to two consecutive terms, or parts of terms, even when ascending to the office in the middle of a term), and she was succeeded by Janet Napolitano, who defeated Matt Salmon. After leaving office, Hull spent three months in New York City, as a public delegate from the United States to the United Nations General Assembly (2004).

After the death of Rose Mofford on September 15, 2016, Hull became the oldest living Governor of Arizona, in addition to being the oldest living Secretary of State of Arizona. An elementary school is named for Hull in Chandler.

== Personal life ==
Hull married Terry Hull, an obstetrician in 1954. They had four children. Hull died on April 16, 2020, at age 84; her husband had died earlier on the same day.

== Electoral history ==
Arizona Gubernatorial Election 1998
Party	Candidate	Votes	%	±%
Republican	Jane Dee Hull (incumbent)	620,188	60.95	
Democratic	Paul Johnson	361,552	35.53	
Libertarian	Katherine "Kat" Gallant	27,150	2.67	

== Legacy ==
Former Arizona governor Janet Napolitano characterized her as "a straight shooter", and then governor Doug Ducey credited her with "providing steady leadership and unwavering commitment to do what's right and ethical"

== See also ==
- List of female governors in the United States
- List of female secretaries of state in the United States
- List of female speakers of legislatures in the United States

Arizona House of Representatives
Preceded by Stan Akers	Member from 19th district 1979–1983; Served alongside: W. A. "Tony" West Jr.	Succeeded by Jan Brewer; Nancy Wessel
Preceded by Pete Dunn	Member from 18th district 1983–1993; Served alongside: Burton S. Barr, George E. Weisz, Susan Gerard	Succeeded by Barry Wong
Political offices
Preceded by Joe Lane	Speaker of the Arizona House of Representatives; 1989–1992	Succeeded by Mark Killian
Preceded by Richard Mahoney	Secretary of State of Arizona; 1995–1997	Succeeded by Betsey Bayless
Preceded by Fife Symington	Governor of Arizona; 1997–2003	Succeeded by Janet Napolitano
Party political offices
Preceded by Fife Symington	Republican nominee for Governor of Arizona; 1998	Succeeded by Matt Salmon
