= Joseph Lane (disambiguation) =

Joseph Lane (1801–1881) was an American general and United States Senator from Oregon.

Joseph or Joe Lane may also refer to:

- Joseph Lane, birth name of actor Nathan Lane
- Joseph Lane (socialist) (1851–1920), English libertarian socialist
- Joseph R. Lane (1858–1931), United States Representative from Iowa
- Joe Lane (footballer) (1892–1959), English professional footballer
- Joe Lane (singer) (1927–2007), Australian jazz vocalist
- Joe Lane (Arizona politician) (1935–2014), American politician
- Joe Lane (cartoonist) (1911–2009), American cartoonist
