= Betsey Bayless =

American politician (born 1944)

17th Secretary of State of Arizona
- In office September 5, 1997 – January 6, 2003
- Governor: Jane Dee Hull
- Preceded by: Jane Dee Hull
- Succeeded by: Jan Brewer

Personal details
- Born: January 10, 1944 (age 82) Phoenix, Arizona, U.S.
- Party: Republican
- Education: University of Arizona

Betsey Bayless (born January 10, 1944) was the 17th Secretary of State of Arizona from September 5, 1997, until January 6, 2003. She was appointed to fill the unexpired term of fellow Republican Jane Dee Hull. She was elected to a full term November 3, 1998.

== Early life and education ==
Bayless was born in Phoenix, and is a third generation Arizonan.

Bayless graduated from Xavier High School in 1962. She earned a bachelor's degree in Latin American Studies and Spanish from the University of Arizona, where, as a Phi Beta Kappa, she received the Freeman Medal as outstanding graduate in 1966. She earned her master's degree in public administration at Arizona State University.

== Political career ==
Prior to her appointment as Secretary of State, Bayless was a member of the Maricopa County Board of Supervisors where she served two terms as board chair. Bayless also served as Director of the state Department of Administration, as Acting Director of the state Department of Revenue and as Assistant Director of the Arizona Board of Regents. She ran in 2002 for the Republican nomination for Governor, but came in a distant second to Matt Salmon, who in turn narrowly lost to Janet Napolitano. Bayless was succeeded in office by fellow Republican Jan Brewer

== Post-political career ==
In 2005, Bayless was hired as the chief executive officer for the Maricopa Integrated Health System (MIHS), the public hospital and health care system of Maricopa County. Bayless has been credited with restoring the MIHS to financial viability and expansion of hospital facilities. Following her retirement from the position in 2013, Bayless became president emeritus for the MIHS.

== Awards ==
Bayless received an honorary doctorate from the University of Arizona in 2001. In 2005, Bayless received the Valley Leadership Woman of the Year Award.

== See also ==
- List of female secretaries of state in the United States

Political offices
Preceded by Jane Dee Hull	Arizona Secretary of State; 1997–2003	Succeeded by Jan Brewer
