= Matt Salmon =

American politician (born 1958)

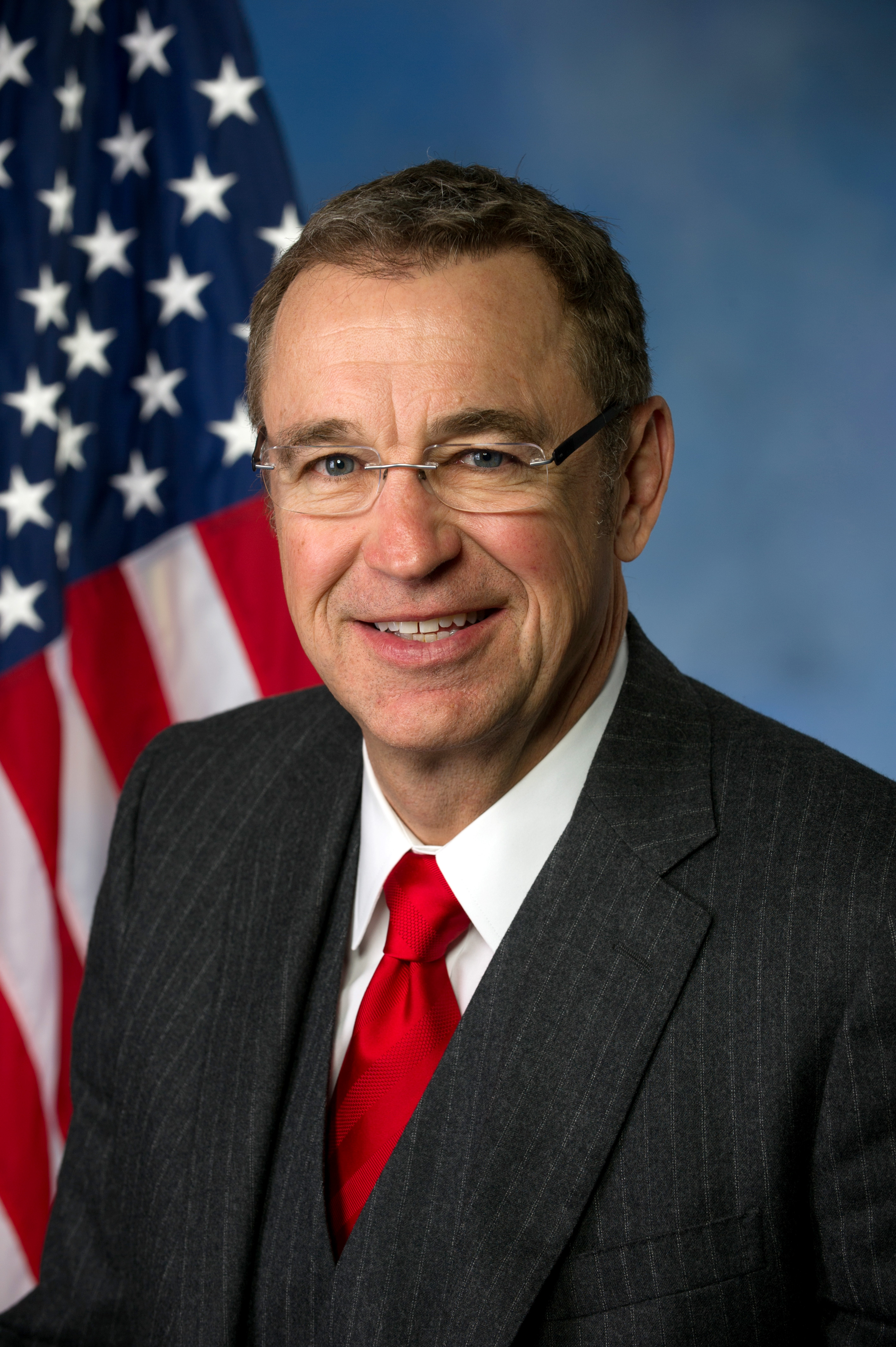
- Official portrait, 2013

Member of the U.S. House of Representatives from Arizona
- In office January 3, 2013 – January 3, 2017
- Preceded by: Jeff Flake (redistricted)
- Succeeded by: Andy Biggs
- Constituency: 5th district
- In office January 3, 1995 – January 3, 2001
- Preceded by: Sam Coppersmith
- Succeeded by: Jeff Flake
- Constituency: 1st district

Chair of the Arizona Republican Party
- In office 2005–2007
- Preceded by: Bob Fannin
- Succeeded by: Randy Pullen

Member of the Arizona Senate from the 21st district
- In office January 14, 1991 – January 3, 1995
- Preceded by: Jerry Gillespie
- Succeeded by: Stan Barnes

Personal details
- Born: Matthew James Salmon; January 21, 1958 (age 68) Salt Lake City, Utah, U.S.
- Party: Republican
- Spouse: Nancy Huish (m. 1981)
- Children: 4
- Education: Arizona State University, Tempe (BA); Brigham Young University (MPA)
- Website: Official website

Matthew James Salmon (born January 21, 1958) is an American politician who served as a U.S. representative from Arizona from 1995 to 2001 and again from 2013 until 2017. A member of the Republican Party, he previously served as the chair of the Arizona Republican Party from 2005 to 2007, and as a member of the Arizona Senate from 1991 to 1995.

On February 25, 2016, Salmon announced his retirement from politics. In June 2016, Arizona State University announced that Salmon would join his undergraduate alma mater as vice president for government affairs in the office of government and community engagement. In this position, Salmon oversees the university's local, state and federal relations teams. He also holds a faculty appointment as a professor of practice in public affairs in the Watts College of Public Service & Community Solutions. In April 2020, Salmon was named chairman of the nonprofit American Kratom Association. He was a candidate in the 2022 Arizona gubernatorial election.

== Early life and education ==
Salmon was born in Salt Lake City, Utah, to Robert James Salmon and Gloria Aagard Salmon. Salmon's maternal great-grandfather was born in Denmark. Salmon moved to Tempe at age 12 and graduated from Mesa High School in 1976. Salmon is a member of the Church of Jesus Christ of Latter-day Saints. He lived in Taiwan from 1977 to 1979 as a missionary and speaks fluent Mandarin Chinese. Salmon was also a Sunday School teacher, cubmaster, and gospel doctrine teacher with his church. After graduating from college, Salmon worked as a telecommunications executive at Mountain Bell in 1981, eventually becoming community relations manager with Mountain Bell's successor, US West. Salmon was offered the position of director of public relations with US West in 1990, but declined the position after deciding to run for state senate. He married Nancy Huish in 1981.

== Arizona Senate (1991–1995) ==
=== Elections ===
In 1990, he ran for the Arizona Senate in the 21st Senate District based in Mesa, Arizona. In the Republican primary, he defeated incumbent State Senator Jerry Gillespie. In the general election, he defeated Democrat Bill Hegarty 60–40%. In 1992, he won re-election to a second term unopposed.

=== Tenure ===
In 1992, he was elected assistant majority leader. He served in that position until 1995.

In 1993, he sponsored legislation that created new drug testing programs for employers. That year, he also called for an independent study of the Department of Economic Services' child welfare agency.

=== Committee assignments ===
- Senate Appropriations Committee
- Senate Indian Gambling Committee (Co-chairman)
- Senate Rules Committee (Chairman)

== U.S. House of Representatives (1995–2001) ==
=== Elections ===
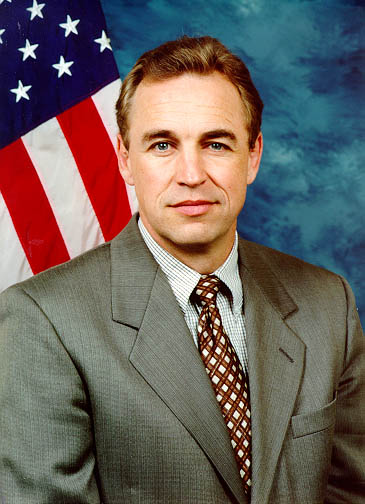
Portrait of Salmon from his first tenure in Congress

1994

Incumbent U.S. Representative Sam Coppersmith, a Democrat, decided to retire after one term in what was then the 1st district in order to run for the U.S. Senate. Salmon won the Republican primary with a plurality of 39% in a five-candidate field. During his first congressional campaign, term limits were a high-profile issue. Salmon was one of many candidates nationwide who pledged to serve only three terms in Congress. In the general election, he defeated Democratic State Senator Chuck Blanchard, 56%–39%.

1996

He won re-election to a second term with 60% of the vote.

1998

He won re-election to a third term with 65% of the vote.

2000

He honored his campaign term limits pledge and did not seek re-election to a fourth term in 2000. He was then succeeded by Jeff Flake.

=== Tenure ===
During the 1994 congressional election, Salmon signed the Contract with America.

In 1999, he unsuccessfully advocated carving Ronald Reagan's face into Mount Rushmore, stating "He's the president that ended the Cold War. You think about 40 years of a major threat, not only to our country but to the world at large, being ended by one man - that's quite an achievement." Salmon's idea garnered support from Reps. Roscoe G. Bartlett (R-Md.) and John R. Kasich (R-Ohio).

Salmon was instrumental in obtaining the January 29, 2000, release of U.S.-based academic researcher Song Yongyi from detention in China on spying charges.

=== Committee assignments ===
- Committee on International Relations
- Committee on Science
- Committee on Small Business
- Committee on Education and the Workforce

== Inter-congressional years (2001–2011) ==
=== 2002 gubernatorial election ===
Incumbent Republican Arizona Governor Jane Dee Hull was ineligible for re-election in 2002. In the Republican primary, Salmon defeated Secretary of State of Arizona Betsy Bayless and Arizona Treasurer Carol Springer 56–30–14%. He won every county in the state. In the general election, he faced Democratic nominee and Arizona Attorney General Janet Napolitano, Libertarian nominee Barry Hess, and former Arizona Secretary of State Richard D. Mahoney (who ran as an independent, but was previously a Democrat). Napolitano defeated Salmon 46.2–45.2%, a difference of 11,819 votes.

=== Political activism ===
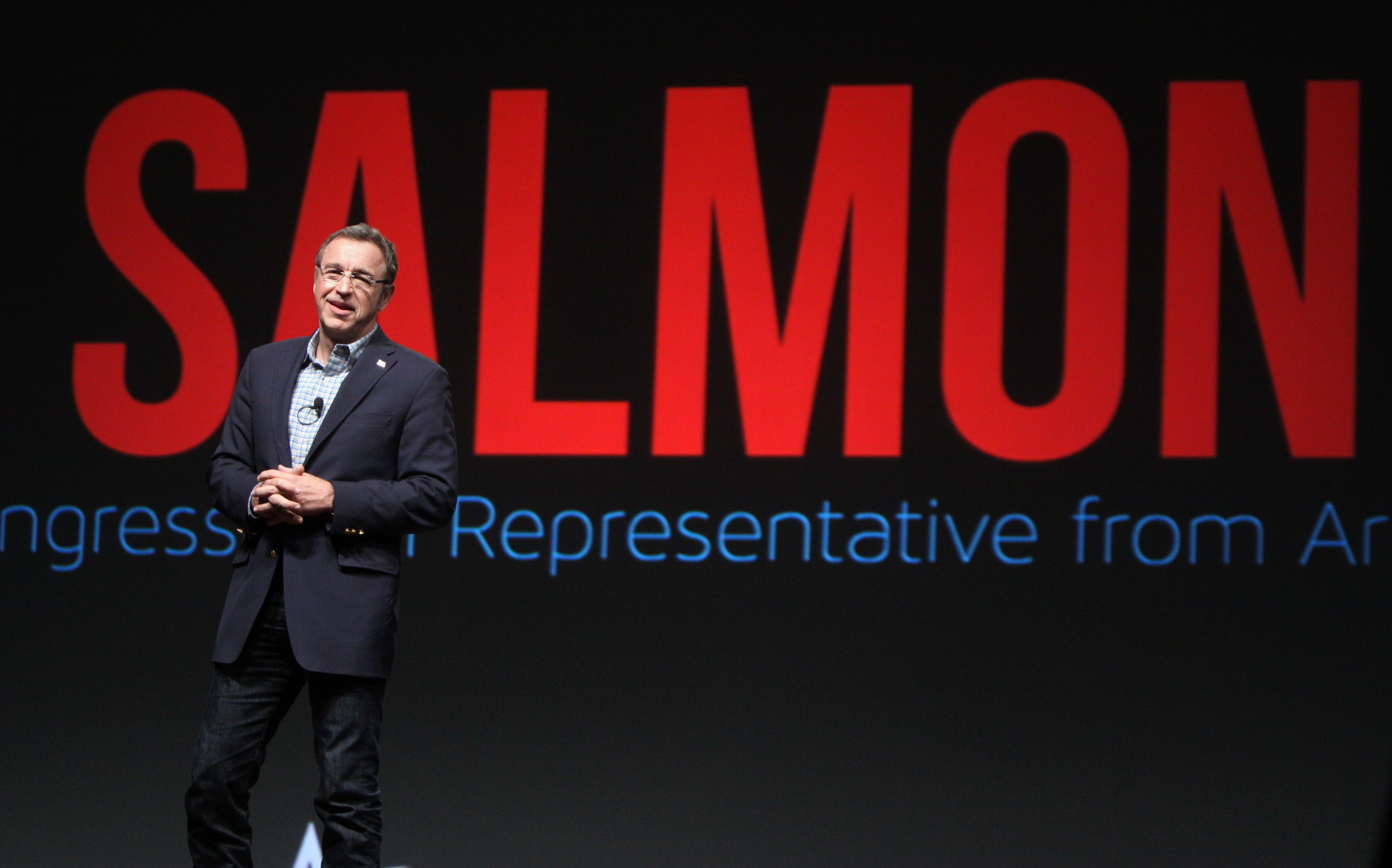
Salmon speaking at FreePac, hosted by FreedomWorks, in Phoenix, Arizona

After that race, he served as a lobbyist and chairman of the Arizona Republican Party. In 2007, he served as campaign manager to businessman Scott Smith's successful campaign for mayor of Mesa. In 2008, he became president of the Competitive Telecommunications Association, a Washington, D.C.–based trade association.

== U.S. House of Representatives (2013–2017) ==
=== Elections ===
==== 2012 ====
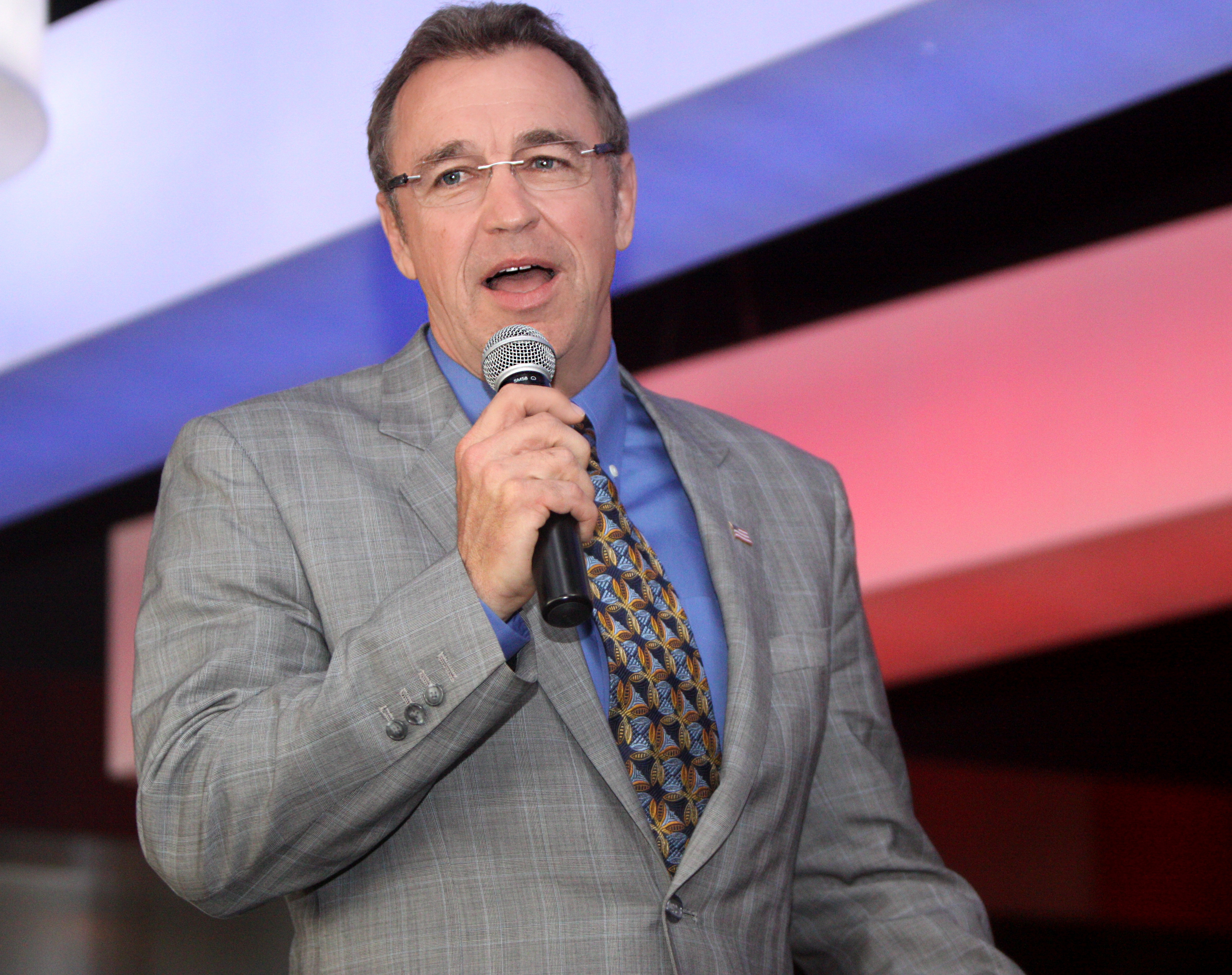
Matt Salmon speaking at "Politics on the Rocks" event in Scottsdale, Arizona, in 2012

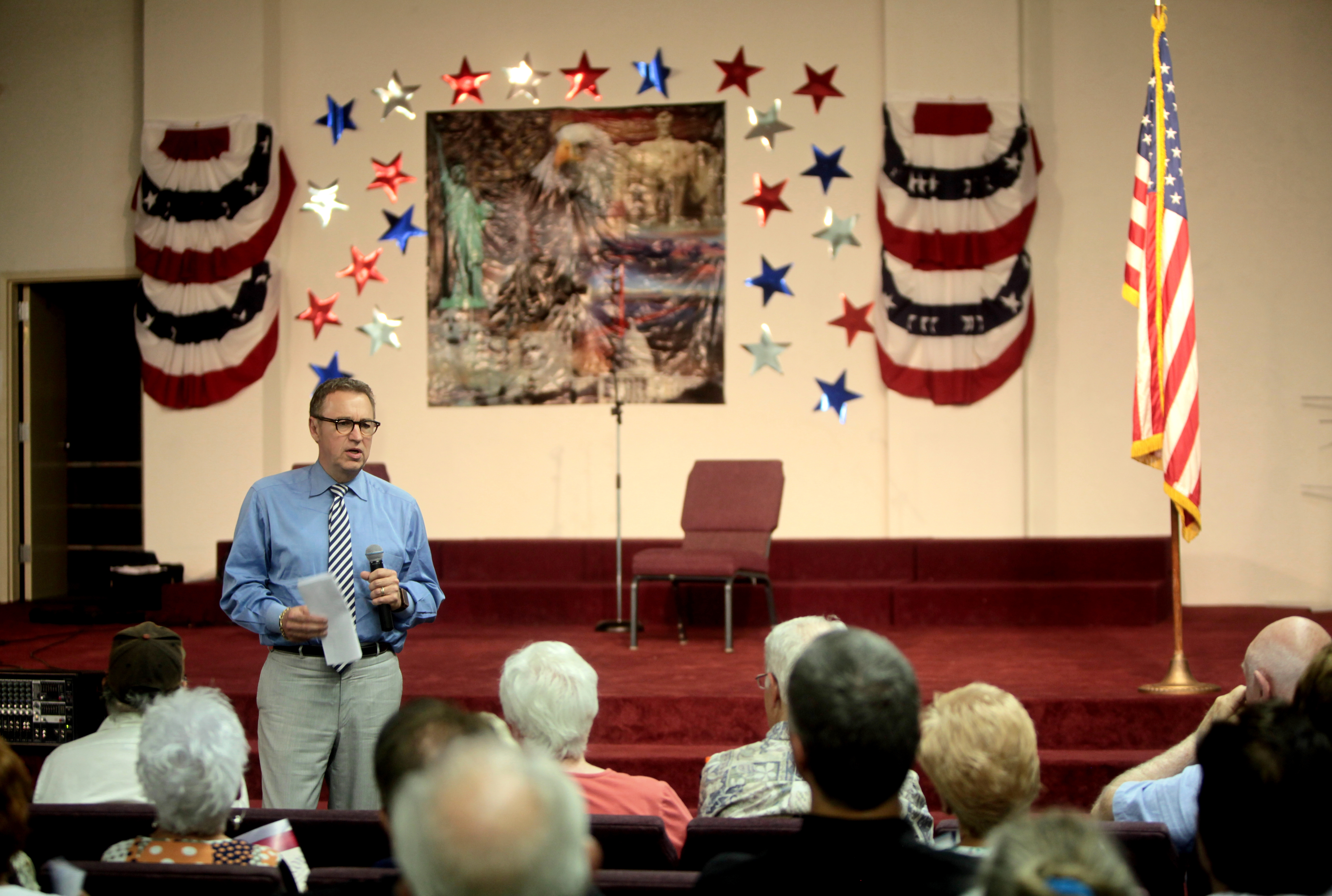
Matt Salmon speaking at a town hall hosted by the American Academy for Constitutional Education in Mesa, Arizona, in 2014

In April 2011, Salmon announced he would seek his old congressional seat, which was now numbered as the 5th district. His conception of term limits had evolved: in 2011 he stated that they were a flawed concept unless they were applied across the board. His successor in Congress, Jeff Flake, was giving up the seat to run for the United States Senate. He was endorsed by the Club for Growth, Governor Jan Brewer, Senator John Thune, U.S. Representative David Schweikert, U.S. Representative Trent Franks, and former Florida Governor Jeb Bush. In the August 28 Republican primary, he defeated former state house speaker Kirk Adams 52–48%. In the general election, Salmon defeated Democrat Spencer Morgan 65–35%.

==== 2014 ====
Salmon was re-elected almost as easily in 2014. However, he announced on February 25, 2016, that he would permanently retire.

=== Committee assignments ===
- Committee on International Relations / Committee on Foreign Affairs
  - Chair, Subcommittee on Western Hemisphere
  - Chair, Subcommittee on Asia and the Pacific
- Committee on Education and the Workforce

=== Tenure ===
In March 2013, he endorsed the idea of bringing back the Hastert Rule, which is that in order to bring a bill to the floor it must have a majority of the majority party's support.

In 2013, Salmon was one of a few dozen Republicans who attempted to defund the Affordable Care Act by allowing a government shutdown. Salmon indicated the shutdown was intentional.

He also proposed an amendment to the United States Constitution limiting House members to three terms in office and Senators to two.

Abortion

Salmon opposes abortion and has opposed federal funding of abortions as well as family-planning assistance that includes abortions.

Gay rights

Salmon voted to ban gay couples adopting children and opposes gay marriage. Salmon has a son who is gay. Salmon's son led the Arizona Log Cabin Republicans; he left the group to focus on medical school.

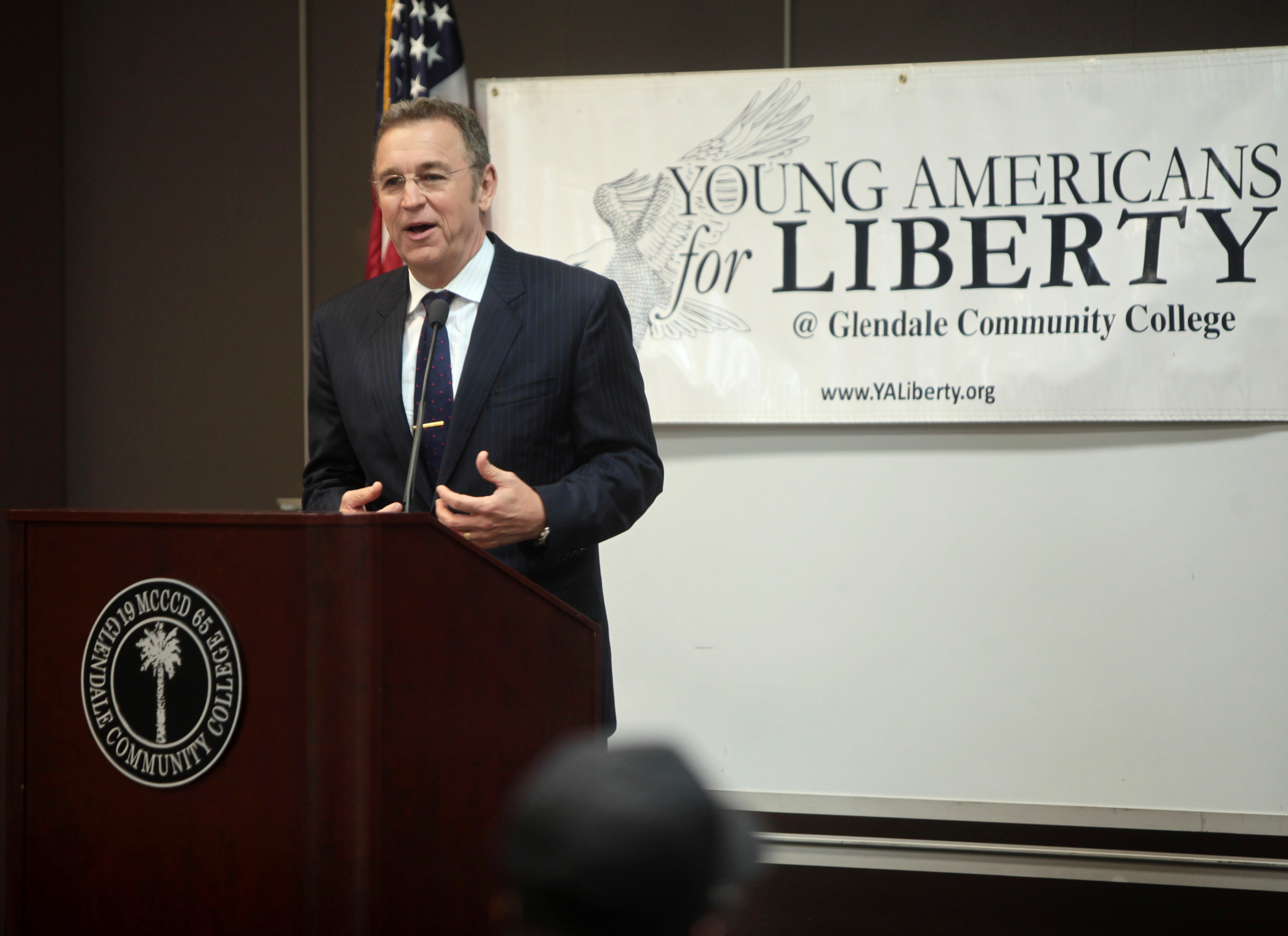
Salmon speaking for Young Americans for Liberty chapter in Glendale, Arizona, in 2014

Budget

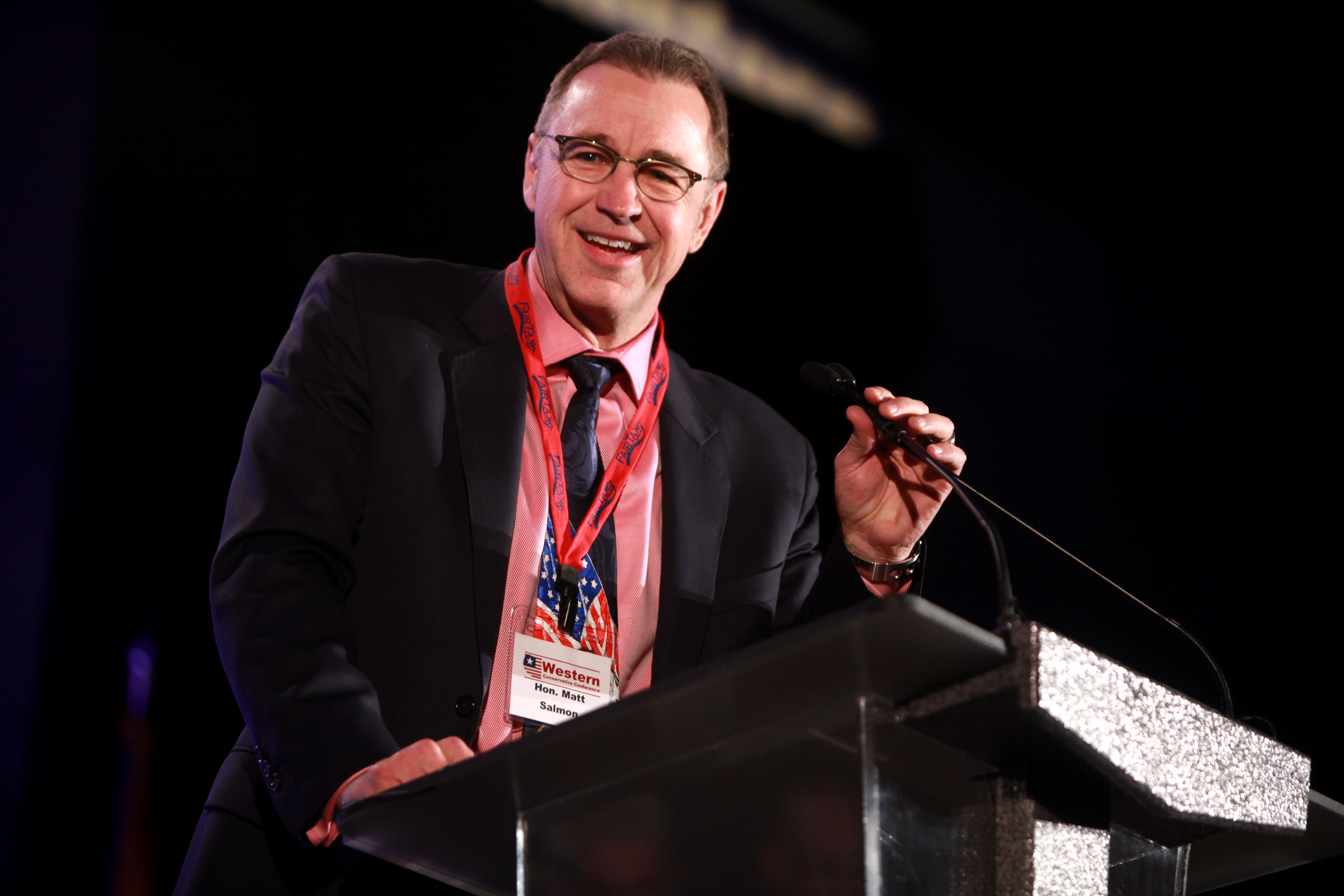
Salmon speaking at the 2014 Western Conservative Conference

Salmon is a fiscal conservative and has often caused rifts and defections in his own party to oppose increasing the deficit. He has strictly opposed raising the debt limit and any new spending without matching cuts. He believes government agencies and institutions should undergo reform, not expansion, to meet their needs.

Taxation

Salmon signed the Taxpayer Protection Pledge, stating he would never vote for legislation to increase taxes on Americans. He opposes new government spending unless it has a plan to initiate some spending cut that will offset the loss. He has voted to cut various taxes, such as the estate and marriage taxes.

He was a cosponsor of a bill that would prevent political bias causing any discrimination in tax treatment.

In 2011, Salmon signed a pledge sponsored by Americans for Prosperity promising to vote against any climate change legislation that would raise taxes.

== 2022 Arizona gubernatorial campaign ==
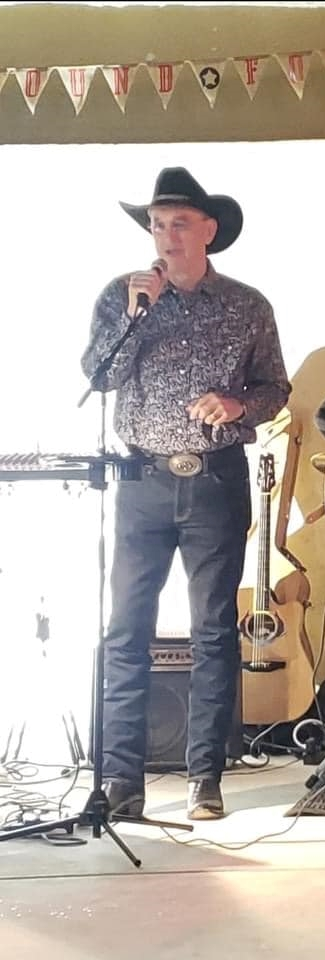
Matt Salmon campaigning for governor in Mesa, Arizona, in 2022

In June 2021, he declared his candidacy in the 2022 race for Arizona governor, to succeed term limited incumbent Republican Doug Ducey. He was endorsed by Ted Cruz and the Club for Growth, among others. Salmon dropped out of the race on June 28, 2022.

== Electoral history ==
Arizona Senate 21st District Election, 1990
Party	Candidate	Votes	%
Republican	Matt Salmon	24,191	59.82
Democratic	Bill Hegarty	16,227	40.12
Write-in	Tom Wilkinson	24	0.06

Arizona Senate 21st District Election, 1992
Party	Candidate	Votes	%
Republican	Matt Salmon (inc.)	34,417	100

Arizona 1st Congressional District Republican Primary Election, 1994
Party	Candidate	Votes	%
Republican	Matt Salmon	19,862	38.97
Republican	Susan Bitter Smith	11,359	22.29
Republican	Linda Rawles	9,596	18.83
Republican	Bev Hermon	8,030	15.76
Republican	Bert Tollefson	2,119	4.16

Arizona 1st Congressional District Election, 1994
Party	Candidate	Votes	%
Republican	Matt Salmon	101,350	56.04
Democratic	Chuck Blanchard	70,627	39.05
Libertarian	Bob Howarth	8,890	4.92

Arizona 1st Congressional District Election, 1996
Party	Candidate	Votes	%
Republican	Matt Salmon (inc.)	135,634	60.18
Democratic	John Cox	89,738	39.82

Arizona 1st Congressional District Election, 1998
Party	Candidate	Votes	%
Republican	Matt Salmon (inc.)	98,840	64.62
Democratic	David Mendoza	54,108	35.38

Arizona Governor Republican Primary Election, 2002
Party	Candidate	Votes	%
Republican	Matt Salmon	174,055	55.99
Republican	Betsey Bayless	92,473	29.75
Republican	Carol Springer	44,333	14.26
Republican/Write-in	Steve Moore	16	nil
Republican/Write-in	Diana Kennedy	8	nil

Arizona Governor Election, 2002
Party	Candidate	Votes	%
Democratic	Janet Napolitano	566,284	46.19
Republican	Matt Salmon	554,465	45.22
Independent	Richard Mahoney	84,947	6.93
Libertarian	Barry Hess	20,356	1.66
Write-in	Carlton Rahmani	29	nil
Write-in	Tracey Sturgess	15	nil
Write-in	Naida Axford	5	nil
Write-in	"Rayj" Raymond Caplette	5	nil
Write-in	D'Herrera Tapia	4	nil
Write-in	"Denny" Talbow	1	nil

Arizona's 5th Congressional District Republican Primary Election, 2012
Party	Candidate	Votes	%
Republican	Matt Salmon	41,078	51.85
Republican	Kirk Adams	38,152	48.15

Arizona's 5th Congressional District Election, 2012
Party	Candidate	Votes	%
Republican	Matt Salmon	183,470	67.19
Democratic	Spencer Morgan	89,589	32.81

Arizona's 5th Congressional District Election, 2014
Party	Candidate	Votes	%
Republican	Matt Salmon (inc.)	124,867	69.58
Democratic	James Woods	54,596	30.42

U.S. House of Representatives
Preceded by Sam Coppersmith	Member of the U.S. House of Representatives from Arizona's 1st congressional district 1995–2001	Succeeded by Jeff Flake
Preceded by David Schweikert	Member of the U.S. House of Representatives from Arizona's 5th congressional district 2013–2017	Succeeded by Andy Biggs
Party political offices
Preceded by Jane Hull	Republican nominee for Governor of Arizona; 2002	Succeeded by Len Munsil
Preceded by Bob Fannin	Chair of the Arizona Republican Party; 2005–2007	Succeeded by Randy Pullen
U.S. order of precedence (ceremonial)
Preceded by Heather Wilson as Former U.S. Representative	Order of precedence of the United States as Former U.S. Representative	Succeeded by Ann Kirkpatrick as Former U.S. Representative
