= 2002 Arizona gubernatorial election =

- November 5, 2002
- Turnout: 56.33%
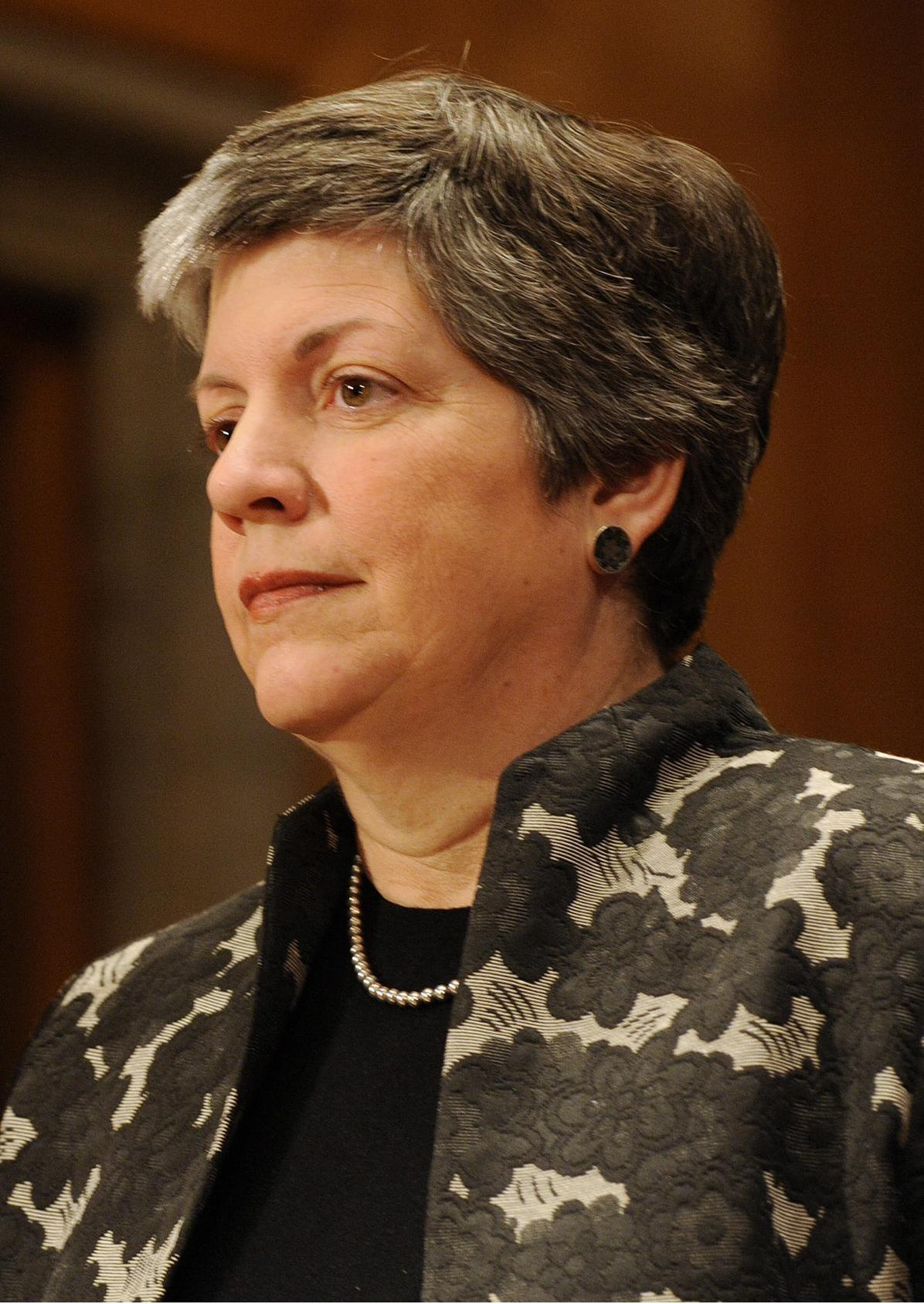

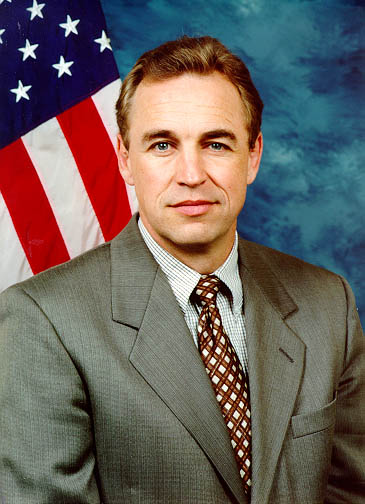

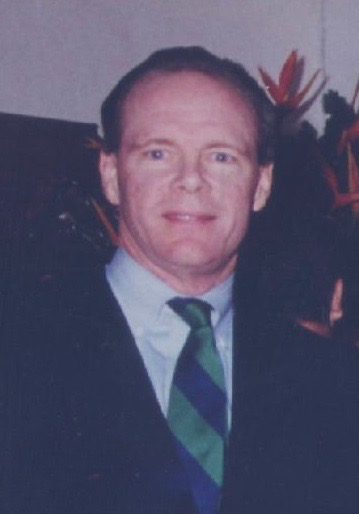
Nominee	Janet Napolitano	Matt Salmon	Richard Mahoney
Party	Democratic	Republican	Independent
Popular vote	566,284	554,465	84,947
Percentage	46.19%	45.22%	6.93%
- County results Napolitano: 40–50% 50–60% 60–70% Salmon: 40–50% 50–60%
Governor before election
Jane Dee Hull
Republican
Elected Governor
Janet Napolitano
Democratic

Republican primary results by county Salmon: 40–50%; 50–60%; 60–70%

Democratic primary results by county Napolitano: 30–40%; 40–50%; 50–60%; 60–70%; Gutierrez: 30–40%

Libertarian primary results by county Hess: 50–60%; 60–70%; 70–80%; 80–90%; Fallon: 50–60%; Tie

The 2002 Arizona gubernatorial election took place on November 5, 2002. Incumbent Republican Governor Jane Dee Hull was term limited. The Democratic nominee, Arizona Attorney General Janet Napolitano, narrowly defeated Republican Matt Salmon, a former U.S. Representative, in a victory that was considered a minor upset. Upon her inauguration, Napolitano became the first woman to succeed another woman as governor of a state. This was the last Arizona gubernatorial election in which the winning candidate did not win Maricopa County.

== Republican primary ==
=== Candidates ===
==== Nominee ====
- Matt Salmon, former U.S. representative from Arizona's 1st congressional district (1995-2001)

==== Eliminated in primary ====
- Betsey Bayless, Secretary of State of Arizona (1997-2003)
- Carol Springer, State Treasurer of Arizona (1993-2003)

==== Declined ====
- Dan Quayle, former vice president (1989-1993) and U.S Senator from Indiana (1981-1989)

=== Results ===
Republican primary results
Party	Candidate	Votes	%
Republican	Matt Salmon	174,055	55.99%
Republican	Betsey Bayless	92,473	29.75%
Republican	Carol Springer	44,333	14.26%
Republican	Steve Moore (write-in)	16	0.01%
Republican	Diana Kennedy (write-in)	8	0.00%
Total votes		310,885	100.00%

== Democratic primary ==
=== Candidates ===
==== Nominee ====
- Janet Napolitano, Attorney General of Arizona (1999-2003)

==== Eliminated in primary ====
- Alfredo Gutierrez, state senator
- Mike Newcomb, physician
- Mark Osterloh, perennial candidate

=== Results ===
Democratic primary results
Party	Candidate	Votes	%
Democratic	Janet Napolitano	128,702	57.23%
Democratic	Alfredo Gutierrez	50,377	22.40%
Democratic	Mark Osterloh	31,422	13.97%
Democratic	Mike Newcomb	14,373	6.39%
Total votes		224,874	100.00%

== Libertarian primary ==
=== Candidates ===
==== Nominee ====
- Barry Ness

==== Eliminated in primary ====
- Garry Fallon

=== Results ===
Libertarian primary results
Party	Candidate	Votes	%
Libertarian	Barry Hess	1,414	51.01%
Libertarian	Gary Fallon	1,358	48.99%
Total votes		2,772	100.00%

== General election ==
=== Debates ===
- Complete video of debate, October 30, 2002

=== Predictions ===
Source	Ranking	As of
The Cook Political Report	Tossup	October 31, 2002
Sabato's Crystal Ball	Lean D (flip)	November 4, 2002

=== Polling ===
Poll source	Date(s) administered	Sample size (Note: Key: A – all adults RV – registered voters LV – likely voters V – unclear)	Margin of error	Janet Napolitano (D)	Matt Salmon (R)	Richard Mahoney (I)	Barry Hess (L)	Other / Undecided
SurveyUSA	October 29–31, 2002	661 (LV)	± 3.9%	43%	41%	11%	3%	1%

=== Results ===
The election was extremely close: Napolitano won by just 11,819 votes out of 1,226,111 cast, the closest gubernatorial election in Arizona in many years. Napolitano also won without carrying Maricopa County. Under Arizonan law, the losing candidate may request a recount, for which that candidate must pay, if the margin of victory is less than one percent but greater than half of one percent. In 2002, the margin of victory was 1.0%, barely allowing a recount.

It soon became apparent that Napolitano had won the election and would be the next governor of Arizona. Salmon acknowledged that the chance of his prevailing in a recount was extremely small and decided not to ask for one (recounts seldom see a swing over 1,000 votes; he was losing by over 10,000). He officially called Napolitano on November 17 and congratulated her on her victory. On November 20, Arizona Secretary of State Betsey Bayless certified the results of the election and declared Napolitano the winner.

Arizona gubernatorial election, 2002
Party	Candidate	Votes	%	±%
Democratic	Janet Napolitano	566,284	46.19%	+10.66%
Republican	Matt Salmon	554,465	45.22%	−15.72%
Independent	Richard D. Mahoney	84,947	6.93%	
Libertarian	Barry Hess	20,356	1.66%	−1.01%
Independent	Carlton Rahmani (write-in)	29	0.00%	
Independent	Tracey Sturgess (write-in)	15	0.00%	
Independent	Naida Axford (write-in)	5	0.00%	
Independent	Raymond Caplette (write-in)	5	0.00%	
Independent	D'Herrera Tapia (write-in)	4	0.00%	
Independent	L. D. Talbow (write-in)	1	0.00%	
Majority		11,819	0.96%	
Total votes		1,226,111	100.00%	
Democratic gain from Republican		Swing	+26.38%	

==== By county ====
County	Janet Napolitano Democratic		Matt Salmon Republican		Richard D. Mahoney Independent		Barry Hess Libertarian		All others Write-in		Margin		Total votes cast
County	#	%	#	%	#	%	#	%	#	%	#	%	Total votes cast
Apache	10,927	61.22%	4,041	22.64%	2,516	14.10%	365	2.04%	1	0.01%	6,886	38.58%	17,850
Cochise	11,401	41.08%	13,210	47.60%	2,713	9.78%	426	1.53%	4	0.01%	-1,809	-6.52%	27,754
Coconino	18,928	54.89%	11,585	33.59%	3,260	9.45%	709	2.06%	3	0.01%	7,343	21.29%	34,485
Gila	7,331	47.44%	6,336	41.00%	1,467	9.49%	317	2.05%	1	0.01%	995	6.44%	15,452
Graham	2,924	36.64%	4,491	56.27%	467	5.85%	99	1.24%	0	0.00%	-1,567	-19.63%	7,981
Greenlee	966	44.91%	955	44.40%	180	8.37%	50	2.32%	0	0.00%	11	0.51%	2,151
La Paz	1,488	41.04%	1,766	48.70%	259	7.14%	113	3.12%	0	0.00%	-278	-7.67%	3,626
Maricopa	313,107	44.43%	337,954	47.95%	42,696	6.06%	10,966	1.56%	27	0.00%	-24,847	-3.53%	704,750
Mohave	13,227	37.59%	18,431	52.38%	2,889	8.21%	639	1.82%	0	0.00%	-5,204	-14.79%	35,186
Navajo	11,669	49.74%	9,423	40.17%	1,920	8.18%	444	1.89%	2	0.01%	2,246	9.57%	23,458
Pima	118,896	51.74%	89,002	38.73%	17,751	7.72%	4,140	1.80%	14	0.01%	29,894	13.01%	229,803
Pinal	18,300	48.13%	16,380	43.08%	2,658	6.99%	682	1.79%	3	0.01%	1,920	5.05%	38,023
Santa Cruz	3,675	57.93%	2,069	32.61%	495	7.80%	105	1.66%	0	0.00%	1,606	25.32%	6,344
Yavapai	23,238	40.50%	28,245	49.23%	4,866	8.48%	1,024	1.78%	3	0.01%	-5,007	-8.73%	57,376
Yuma	10,207	46.67%	10,577	48.36%	810	3.70%	277	1.27%	1	0.00%	-370	-1.69%	21,872
Totals	566,284	46.19%	554,465	45.22%	84,947	6.93%	20,356	1.66%	59	0.00%	11,819	0.96%	1,226,111

==== Counties that flipped from Republican to Democratic ====
- Coconino (largest municipality: Flagstaff)
- Gila (largest city: Payson)
- Greenlee (largest city: Clifton)
- Navajo (largest city: Show Low)
- Pima (largest municipality: Tucson)
- Pinal (largest city: San Tan Valley)
- Santa Cruz (largest municipality: Nogales)
