= World Chiropractic Alliance =

The World Chiropractic Alliance (WCA) is a not-for-profit corporation founded in Arizona in 1989 that aims to be the voice of conservative "straight" chiropractors (those who rely exclusively on subluxation-correction).

The Alliance claims to be "the only major chiropractic organization which passionately defends the rights of subluxation-based doctors and will stand up against those who would corrupt chiropractic by denying its philosophical and vitalistic foundations," and believes that spinal adjustment should begin at birth and continue for life, even in the absence of symptoms. It tends to have an antagonistic relationship to the World Federation of Chiropractic because of philosophical differences.

== Background ==
The WCA supports "straight" chiropractic, with its emphasis on subluxation-correction, drug-free care, and non-medical approaches to wellness. This stance has brought it into conflict with the majority "mixer" school of chiropractic that favors use of more mainstream medical techniques alongside the traditional chiropractic adjustments. The WCA denies that chiropractic adjustments pose any significant risk of stroke. The WCA is against vaccinations and believes that "chiropractic adjustments have a positive impact on the immune system," a claim which, "to date, the data reviewed do not validate this theory."

The WCA advocates the use of chiropractic adjustments "for asymptomatic patients":

"It is the position of the World Chiropractic Alliance that chiropractic care to detect and correct vertebral subluxations offers benefits for all people, including those who do not demonstrate symptoms of a disease or health condition. Therefore, the presence of symptoms and/or a medical diagnosis should not be a factor in determining the need for or appropriateness of chiropractic adjustments, nor should the presence of symptoms be required by any chiropractic board, insurance company or court of law to justify the rendering of chiropractic care to any patient."

In 2002, the WCA was represented by Leona Marie Fischer, member of the WCA International Board of Governors, on the United States Department of Veterans Affairs "Chiropractic Advisory Committee."

== Structure ==
=== Membership ===
Membership is open to all chiropractic doctors and students. A board of governors formulates policy and administers the running of the organization.

=== Leadership ===
The WCA was founded by Terry Rondberg, DC, who still is CEO. Other leadership positions are:

- Timothy J. Feuling, DC, Vice President
- Cindy Rondberg, CFO
- Barbara Bigham, Director of Communication

The WCA relies on the assistance of an "International Board of Governors" to help formulate and promulgate its policies and positions, but declines to name them.

== Antagonistic relationship to the World Federation of Chiropractic ==
The WCA's philosophy differs from that of the World Federation of Chiropractic (WFC). It has challenged the WFC's authority "to define chiropractic identity" or "to speak for the chiropractic profession." Rondberg has stated that "subluxation-based doctors of chiropractic being subjected to extreme prejudice in many nations. . . Groups such as the World Federation of Chiropractic have tried repeatedly to define chiropractic as a quasi-medical musculoskeletal treatment in these nations, and the WCA has had to vigorously defend against their actions."

== Lobbying, AzScam scandal, and patient solicitation scheme ==
The WCA apparently was involved as a lobbying group until 2006, but that appears to have stopped in the past few years.

In 1991, the WCA lobbyist was involved in the AzScam scandal and was arrested "for bribery and for . . . laundering large contributions through a list of individuals . . . [including] Rondberg, his wife, and other WCA principals. . ." Rondberg, his wife, and other WCA officials were implicated in this illegal political contribution affair. By 1993, both founders of the WCA were defendants in the "AzScam" case. Both Rondberg and Immerman signed agreements with the Maricopa County Attorney's office admitting to civil charges of illegal contributions. Immerman was required to pay a fine of $11,160 and Rondberg was required to pay a fine of $9,840.

Many years later, Immerman responded in WCA's April, 2001 edition of "The Chiropractic Journal" to the negative publicity of the incident published by Dynamic Chiropractic in 1992.

They were also involved in a "patient solicitation scheme known as the Vertebral Subluxation Research Institute (VSRI)" which Dynamic Chiropractic described as "almost universally condemned as teaching illegal and unethical practices within the chiropractic profession. . ." "VSRI taught chiropractors how to recruit 'research volunteers' and convert them into lifetime chiropractic patients. Its chiropractor clients were instructed to use telemarketing and other approaches to ask people to volunteer for a nationwide study on spinal conditions. . . . The VSRI program was concluded in 1991."

== Self-awareness as a persecuted group ==
The WCA clearly describes the points of view of their presumed enemies in their fundraising:

Join the fight to save chiropractic from our enemies
Powerful forces within and without the profession are trying to destroy chiropractic. Our enemies are taking to the streets, the media and even the internet to stop you from providing uniquely chiropractic care. They say chiropractic is dangerous ... that it's quackery ... that it should never be used for children ... that it should be limited to back pain ... that anything over 6-12 visits is fraud ... that subluxations don't really exist!
We have to STOP THE LIARS NOW. Help us help you to save our profession and our right to care for all people!

In June 2003, the WCA joined forces with the American Chiropractic Association in attacks on what they termed "biased" media coverage of a report in the journal Neurology which wrote about the "dangers of chiropractic neck adjustment."

In May 2006, in response to signs on the sides of some buses in two Connecticut cities which solicited contact from people who might have been injured by chiropractic treatment, the WCA's attorneys "issued a cease and desist warning letter demanding the signs be immediately removed." The signs were sponsored by the "Chiropractic Stroke Victims Awareness Group.” After this (June 2006) they formed a chiropractic "anti-defamation campaign," with aggressive retaliation tactics clearly described.
