= Joe Lane (cartoonist) =

American cartoonist

Joseph Eichberger (November 13, 1911 – March 20, 2009) was an American cartoonist best known for his work under the pen name Joe Lane; he also used the name Joseph Berger. Eichberger began his cartooning work before serving in the US Navy during World War II, using a pseudonym due to conflicts with his work as a firefighter. Eichberger was a fire engineer for the Chicago Fire Department.

== Career ==
Eichberger did cartooning for the Chicago Herald and Examiner.

Eichberger's career included work for DC Comics that predates Action Comics issue 1, which meant that before his death he was one of the last remaining Platinum age creators.

Eichberger is best known for his cartoons for Extension Magazine, a publication of the Catholic Church Extension Society. Starting in the 1940s, he provided a Sunday-sized comic strip called Davey, using the Joseph Berger pen name. His primary work in the magazine under the Joe Lane name was during the 1950s and into the 1960s. He sold his first cartoon about nuns to Extension in 1942, before beginning his wartime service. He returned to doing nun cartoons for the magazine regularly after Bill O'Malley, who had gained attention on the magazine doing cartoons about "Two Little Nuns", left the magazine in a tiff over payment. In O'Malley's copyright lawsuit that followed, Eichberger provided a deposition. The first collection of the Joe Lane nun cartoons had preorders of over 50,000 copies. Lane also provided cartoons about clergymen. In 2009, columnist Dan Savage noted that some were finding new relevance in his clergy cartoons, reinterpreting them in the light of the Church's sex scandals.

== Publications ==
=== As Joe Eichberger ===
- More Fun Comics volume 1 issue 12 (1936), volume 2 issues 1 and 2 (1936), volume 3 issue 2 (1937)
- New Comics volume 1 issues 9 and 10 (1936)

=== As Joe Lane ===
==== Extension cartoon collections ====
- More Little Nuns, published 1951 (reviewed as "lives up to the high standards of its predecessor", referring to the earlier-released Bill O'Malley cartoon collection Two Little Nuns, in The Liguorian.)
- The Fathers, published 1952 (reviewed by Rev. Francis C. Lightbourn as "will be relished equally by Anglican and Roman clergy – and by all who know the clergy.")
- Our Little Nuns, published 1954
- Priests Are Like People, published 1954 (reviewed as "any priest or seminarian will find at least one typical cartoon in this collection to remind him that 'a sad saint is a sorry saint'" in Franciscan Message)

==== Michael Book Co. cartoon collections ====
Michael Book Co. was Eichberger's self-publishing imprint.

- Heirs of Heaven, published 1955 (reviewed by Best Sellers: The Semi-Monthly Book Review as "another bundle of refreshing gaiety in this collection which finds that humor is not banished from the lives of those who dedicate themselves to service of the Lord in convent and in parish church. No matter who you may be, these cartoons will bring chuckles without risking a single blush.")
- Yes, Sister! No, Sister!, published 1956
- Nuns So Lovable, published 1957
- Vale of Dears, published 1958 (reviewed as "attractively drawn and amusing cartoons about the lighter side of life among the Catholic Sisters" in The Book Buyer's Guide)
- Kids' Sisters, published 1959
- All For Nuns, published 1960
- Nice Habits, published 1961
- Veiled Humor, published 1962 (reviewed as "Wordy captions and coy cartoons spoil even the ones that almost made it" by Sister Mary Hilary in The Living Church)

==== Illustrations ====
- Tremblay, Edward A., When You Go To Tonga, Apostolate of the Daughters of St. Paul Press, 1954

== Personal life ==
Eichberger and his wife, Catherine Quinn Eichberger (married in July, 1943), had two children.
