= Janet Napolitano =

American politician (born 1957)

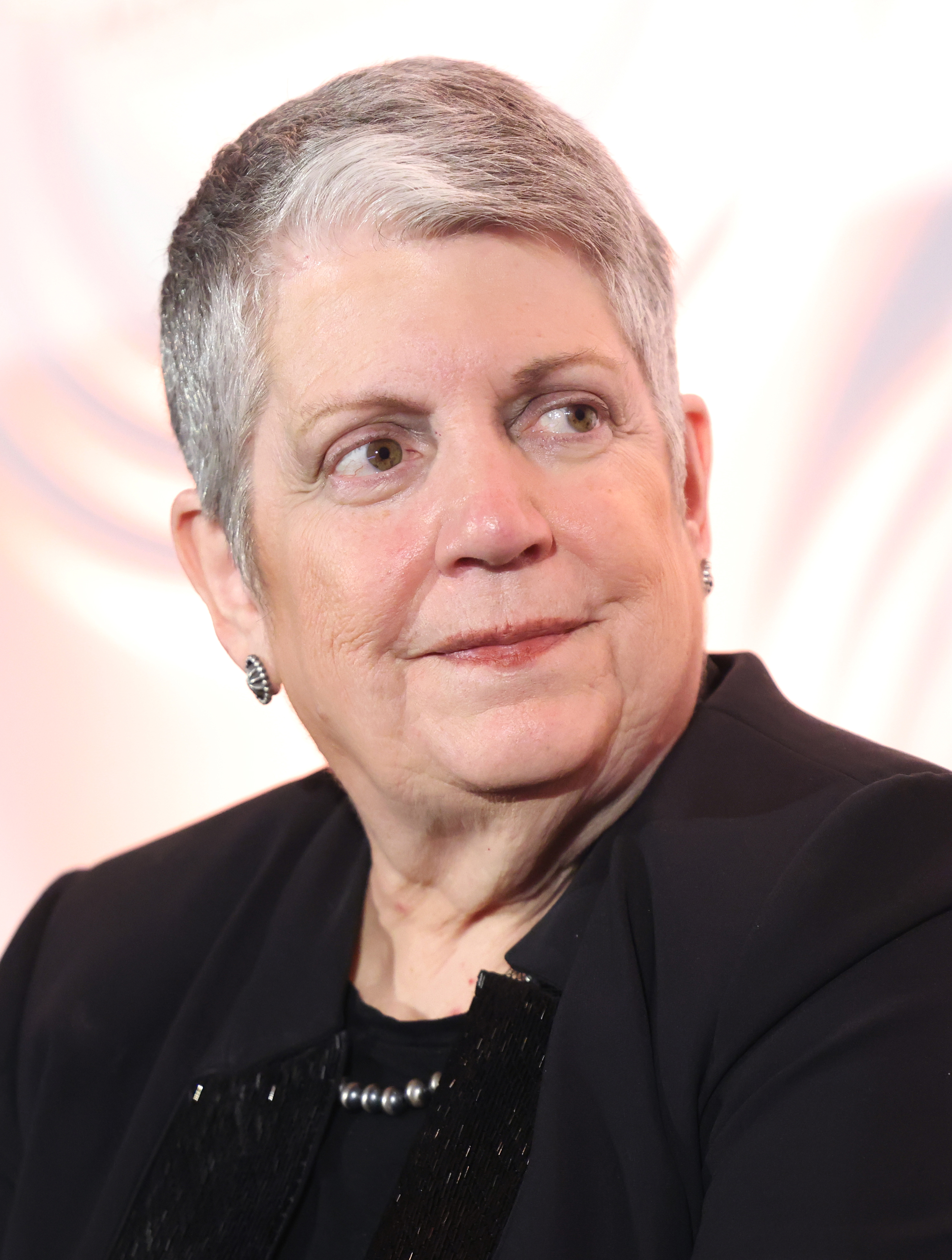
- Napolitano in 2024

20th President of the University of California System
- In office September 30, 2013 – August 1, 2020
- Preceded by: Mark Yudof
- Succeeded by: Michael V. Drake

3rd United States Secretary of Homeland Security
- In office January 21, 2009 – September 6, 2013
- President: Barack Obama
- Deputy: Jane Holl Lute; Rand Beers (acting)
- Preceded by: Michael Chertoff
- Succeeded by: Jeh Johnson

21st Governor of Arizona
- In office January 6, 2003 – January 21, 2009
- Preceded by: Jane Dee Hull
- Succeeded by: Jan Brewer

23rd Attorney General of Arizona
- In office January 4, 1999 – January 6, 2003
- Governor: Jane Dee Hull
- Preceded by: Grant Woods
- Succeeded by: Terry Goddard

United States Attorney for the District of Arizona
- In office November 19, 1993 – November 1, 1997
- President: Bill Clinton
- Preceded by: Linda Akers
- Succeeded by: Jose de Jesus Rivera

Personal details
- Born: Janet Ann Napolitano; November 29, 1957 (age 68) New York City, New York, U.S.
- Party: Democratic
- Education: Santa Clara University (BS); University of Virginia (JD)
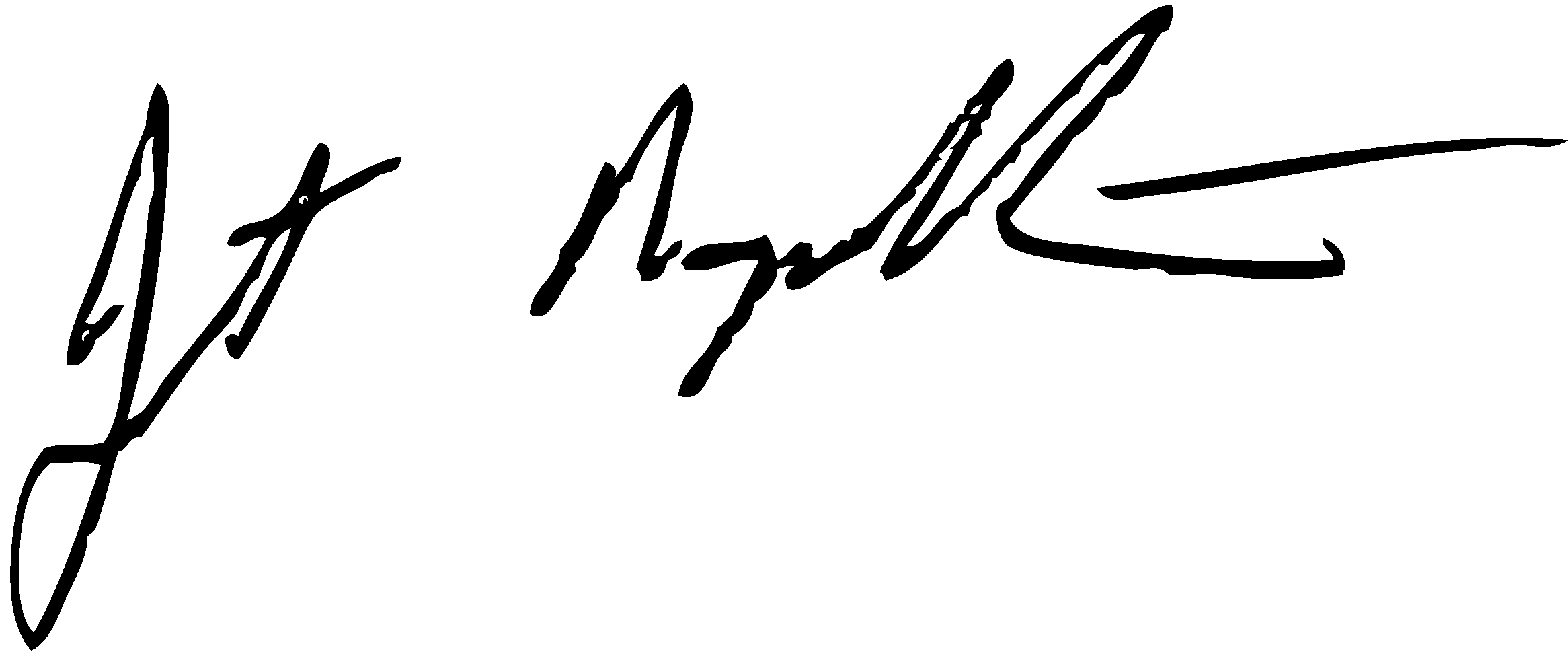
- Signature

Janet Ann Napolitano (/nəpɒlɪˈtænoʊ/; born November 29, 1957) is an American politician and lawyer. She is on the faculty at the Goldman School of Public Policy at the University of California, Berkeley, since 2015. Napolitano served as 20th president of the University of California from 2013 to 2020, as the United States Secretary of Homeland Security under the first Obama administration from 2009 to 2013, as the 21st governor of Arizona from 2003 to 2009, as the 23rd attorney general of Arizona from 1999 to 2003, and as the United States Attorney for the District of Arizona from 1993 to 1997.

Forbes ranked her as the world's ninth most powerful woman in 2012 and eighth most powerful woman in 2013. She served as chairwoman of the National Governors Association for the 2006–2007 cycle. In 2008, she was listed by The New York Times as one of the women most likely to become the first female president of the United States. She sat on the bipartisan advisory board of States United Democracy Center. She was elected to the American Philosophical Society in 2018.

== Early life and education ==
Janet Napolitano was born on November 29, 1957, in New York City, the daughter of Jane Marie (née Winer) and Leonard Michael Napolitano, who was the dean of the University of New Mexico School of Medicine. Her father was of Italian descent and her mother had German and Austrian ancestry. Her grandfather was named Filippo Napolitano.

Napolitano is a Methodist. She is the oldest of three children, with a younger brother and sister. She was raised in Pittsburgh, Pennsylvania and Albuquerque, New Mexico, where she graduated from Sandia High School in 1975.

Napolitano received a Bachelor of Science summa cum laude with a major in political science from Santa Clara University in 1979 and a Juris Doctor from the University of Virginia in 1983.

Napolitano was Santa Clara's first female valedictorian, a Truman Scholar, and a member of Phi Beta Kappa. After graduation, she worked as an analyst for the United States Senate Committee on the Budget. In 1978, she studied for a term at the London School of Economics as part of Santa Clara's exchange program through IES Abroad. She then attended the University of Virginia School of Law after which she served as a law clerk for Judge Mary M. Schroeder of the United States Court of Appeals for the Ninth Circuit, then joined Schroeder's former firm, Lewis and Roca, in Phoenix. She was named a partner of the firm in 1989.

== Early career ==
In 1991, while a partner at Lewis and Roca LLP, Napolitano served as an attorney for Anita Hill. Hill testified in the U.S. Senate that then U.S. Supreme Court nominee Clarence Thomas had sexually harassed her ten years earlier when she was his subordinate at the Equal Employment Opportunity Commission.

In 1993, Napolitano was appointed by President Bill Clinton as United States attorney for the District of Arizona, an office she held until 1997. As U.S. attorney, she was involved in the investigation of Michael Fortier of Kingman, Arizona, in connection with the Oklahoma City bombing. She ran for and won the position of Arizona attorney general in 1998. During her tenure as attorney general, she focused on consumer protection issues and improving general law enforcement.

While serving as attorney general, she spoke at the 2000 Democratic National Convention just three weeks after having a mastectomy. Napolitano recalled that the pain was so unbearable that she could not stand up. "Work and family helped me focus on other things while I battled the cancer," says Napolitano. "I am very grateful for all the support I had from family, friends and Arizonans." As attorney general she also defended Arizona's death penalty statute before the United States Supreme Court when she argued Ring v. Arizona.

== Governor of Arizona (2003–2009) ==
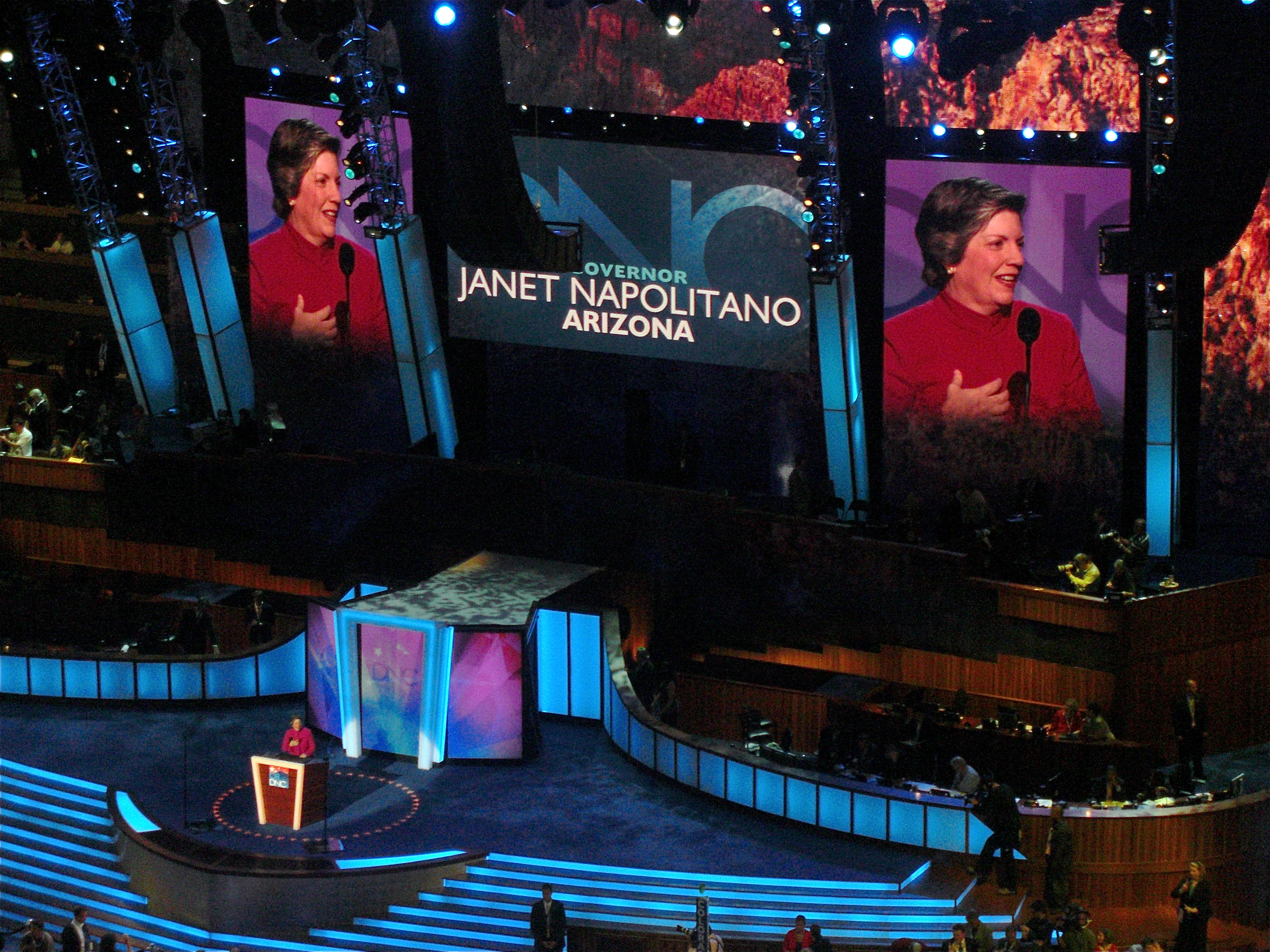
Napolitano speaks during the second day of the 2008 Democratic National Convention in Denver, Colorado.

In 2002, Napolitano narrowly won the gubernatorial election with 46 percent of the vote, succeeding Republican Jane Dee Hull and defeating her Republican opponent, former congressman Matt Salmon, who received 45 percent of the vote. She was Arizona's third female governor and the first female elected governor in the United States to succeed another elected female governor. She was also the first Democrat popularly elected to the governorship since Bruce Babbitt left office in 1987, and the first female governor of Arizona to be elected outright.

She spoke at the 2004 Democratic Convention, where some initially considered her to be a possible running mate for presidential candidate Sen. John Kerry in the 2004 presidential election. Kerry selected Senator John Edwards instead. In November 2005, Time magazine named her one of the five best governors in the U.S.

As Governor, Napolitano set records for total number of vetoes issued. In 2005, she set a single-session record of 58 vetoes, breaking Jane Dee Hull's 2001 record of 28. This was followed in June 2006, less than four years into her term, when she issued her 115th veto and set the all-time record for vetoes by an Arizona governor. The previous record of 114 vetoes was set by Bruce Babbitt during his nine years in office. By the time she left office, Napolitano had issued 180 vetoes.

Napolitano supported many educational initiatives. She successfully negotiated the creation of voluntary full-day kindergarten in Arizona. The state previously only funded half-day programs. She created a literacy program, and acquired funding for an increase in teacher salaries. She spearheaded significant investments in higher education, including funding a Phoenix campus for the University of Arizona College of Medicine.

She also built the state's rainy day fund to more than $650 million, at the time the highest ever. She played a leading role in the successful bid to host Super Bowl XLII in Glendale, Arizona, expanded the number of teams in the Cactus league and invested heavily in tourism and economic development initiatives. She was one of the first governors to call for the National Guard at the border after declaring a state emergency related to border security.

In November 2006, Napolitano was re-elected as governor, defeating the Republican challenger, Len Munsil, by a nearly 2:1 ratio. She was the first woman to be re-elected to that office and the first gubernatorial candidate in state history to win every county and every legislative district in Arizona. Arizona's constitution limits its governors to two consecutive terms, so Napolitano would not have been eligible to seek a third term in office in 2010.

In January 2006, Napolitano won the Woodrow Wilson Award for Public Service. She served as a member of the Democratic Governors Association Executive Committee. She has also served previously as chair of the Western Governors Association, and the National Governors Association. She served as NGA chair from 2006 to 2007, and was the first female governor and first governor of Arizona to serve in that position.

== Secretary of Homeland Security (2009–2013) ==
In February 2006, Napolitano was named by The White House Project as one of "8 in '08", a group of eight female politicians who were suggested as possible candidates for president in 2008. On January 11, 2008, she endorsed then Illinois Senator Barack Obama as the Democratic nominee for president. On November 5, 2008, she was named to the advisory board of the Obama-Biden Transition Project.

=== Tenure ===
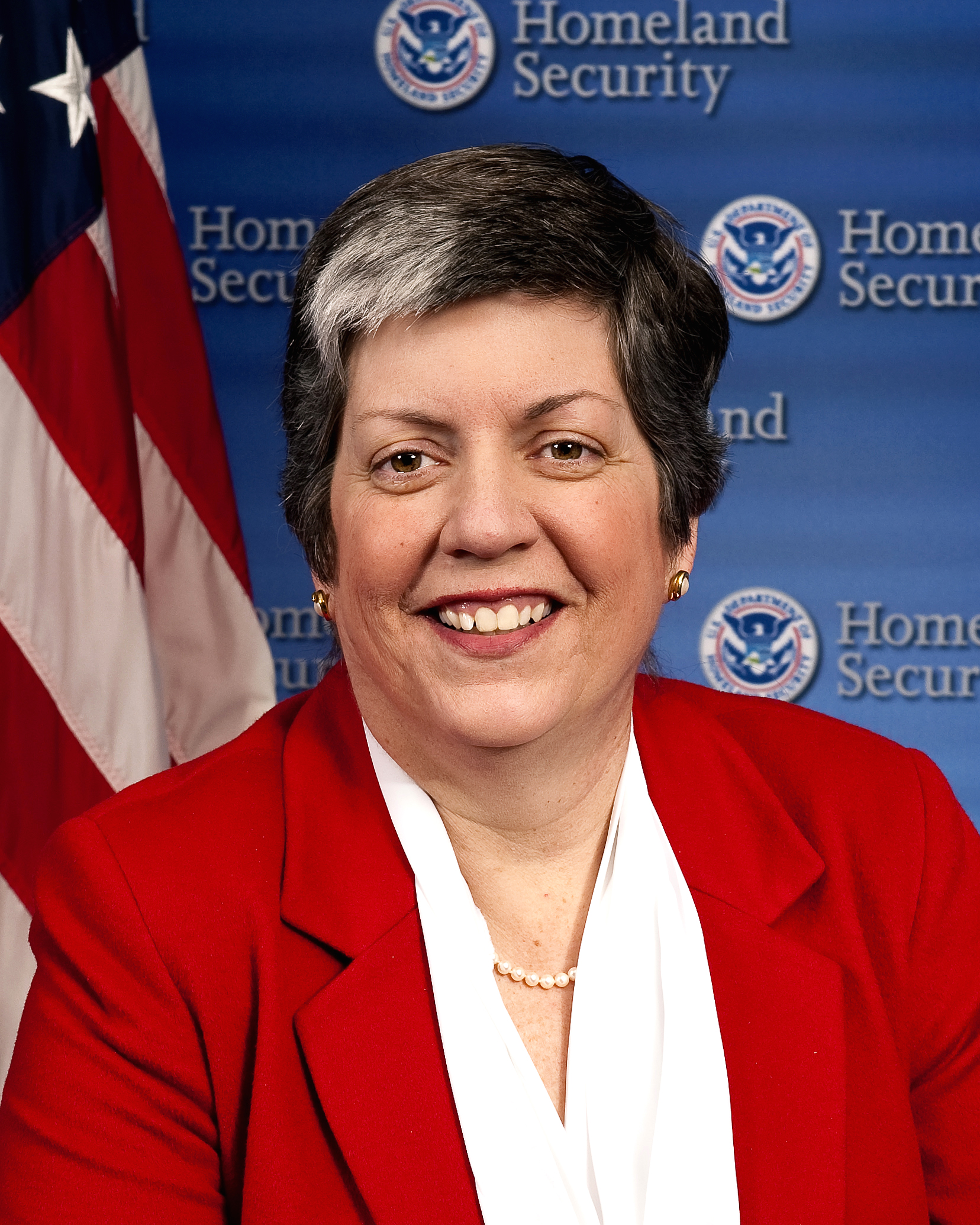
Official portrait, 2009

On December 1, 2008, Barack Obama introduced Napolitano as his nominee for United States Secretary of Homeland Security. On January 20, 2009, Napolitano was confirmed, becoming the first woman appointed as Secretary in the relatively new department, and the fourth person to hold the position overall (including one acting secretary). Arizona Secretary of State Jan Brewer became governor of Arizona.

In March 2009, Napolitano told the German news site Der Spiegel that while there is always a threat from terrorism, she preferred to talk about "man-caused' disasters" as a way "to move away from the politics of fear toward a policy of being prepared for all risks that can occur".

In April 2009, in an interview defending her plans to tighten the Canada–US border, Napolitano incorrectly implied that the September 11 attack perpetrators entered the United States from Canada. This claim was made by several politicians based upon erroneous news reports in the days after the attack. Napolitano explained that she misunderstood the question and was referring to other individuals who had planned attacks and entered through Canada, but Canadian diplomats rebuked her for helping perpetuate a myth.

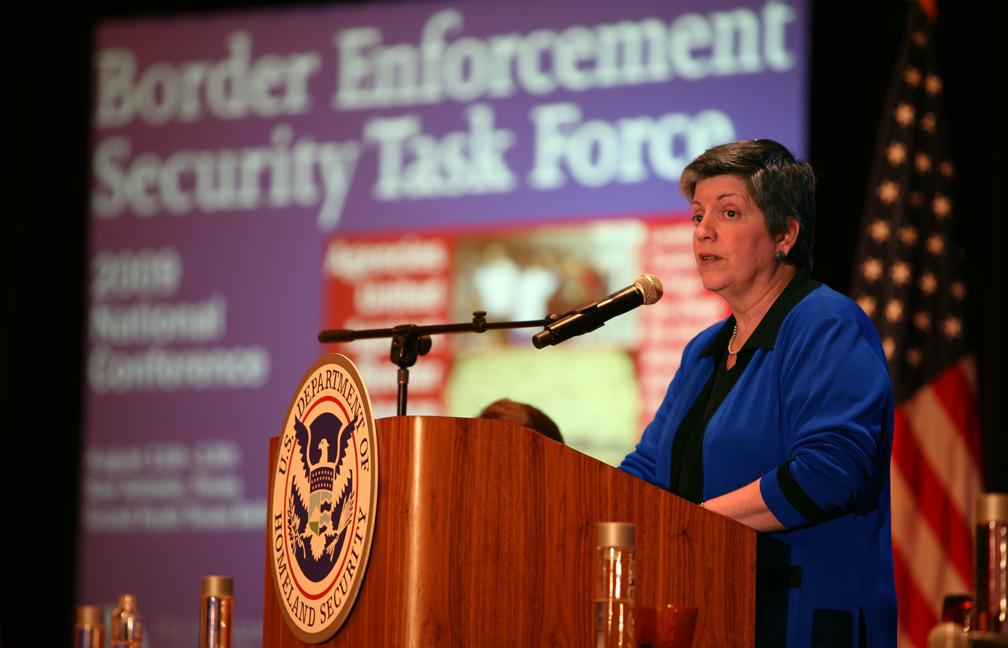
Napolitano announcing a border security task force.

In response to criticism, she later said that while she knew no 9/11 terrorists entered the U.S. through Canada, "there are other instances ... when suspected terrorists have attempted to enter our country from Canada to the United States ... [s]ome of these are well known to the public, such as the millennium bomber, while others are not due to security reasons." There has only been one publicly reported case of terrorists coming to the United States through Canada, that of Ahmed Ressam, an Algerian citizen who was in Canada illegally and who had planned an attack on Los Angeles International Airport (LAX) as part of the 2000 millennium attack plots. Nevertheless, Napolitano later claimed that "Canada allows people into its country that we do not allow into ours" as a justification for treating the Mexican and Canadian borders equally.

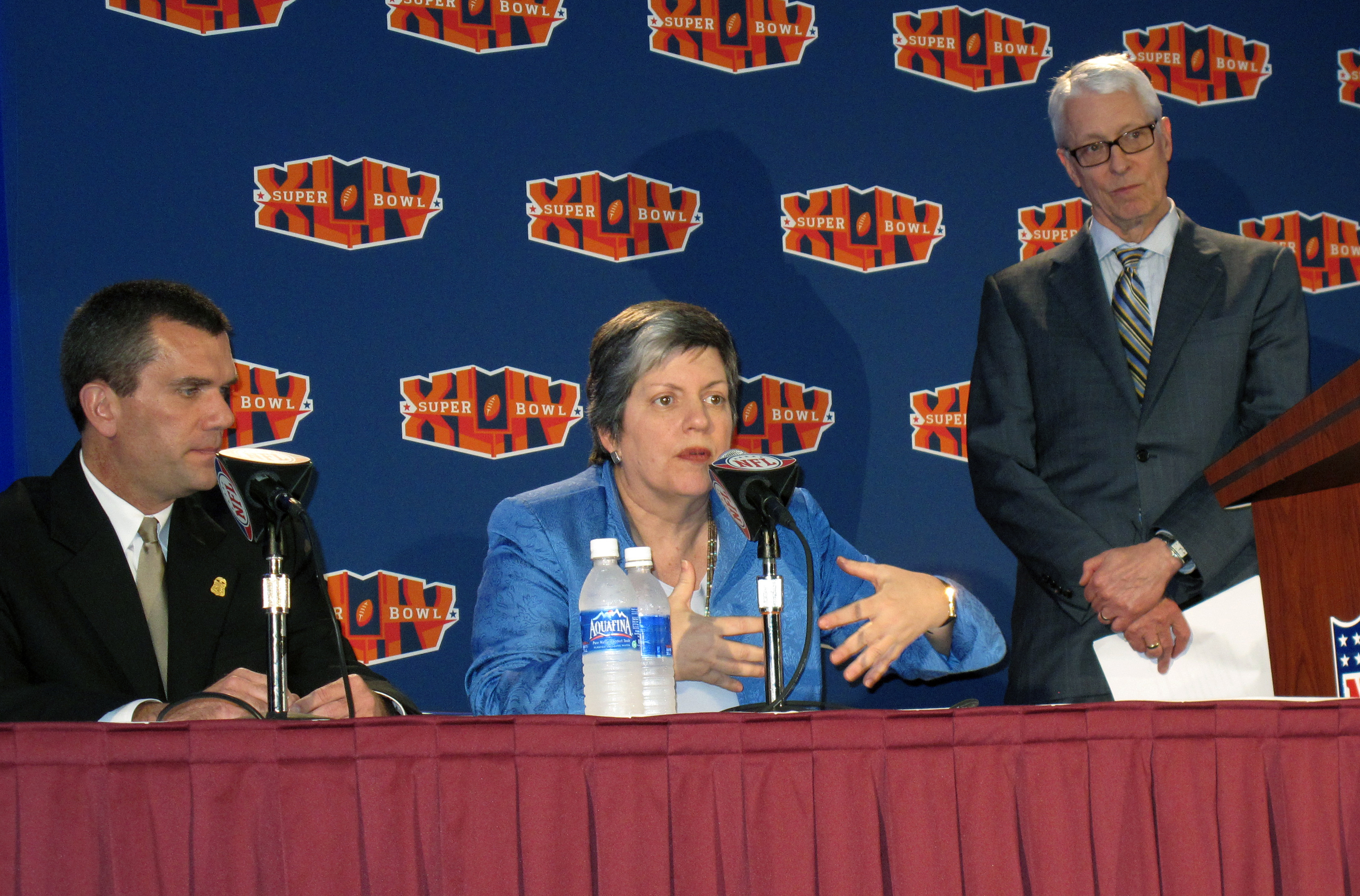
Napolitano discussing security at a Super Bowl XLIV press conference. The Super Bowl is designated as a National Special Security Event by Homeland Security.

==== H1N1 flu ====
As Secretary, Napolitano was a central leader in the federal response to the 2009 flu pandemic. Rather than closing schools and businesses, which would have led to wide-scale disruption, Napolitano advanced a strategy of proactive education for prevention. This included a basic virus-prevention education program. Ultimately, as a result of the programs implemented by Napolitano and others, much of the damage expected from this flu was mitigated.

==== Right-wing extremism memo ====
Napolitano was the subject of controversy after the release of a Department of Homeland Security threat assessment report that was seen as derogatory towards armed forces veterans. The report focused on potential threats from the radical right. Rightwing [sic] Extremism: Current Economic and Political Climate Fueling Resurgence in Radicalization and Recruitment was made public in April 2009. The report suggested several factors, including the election of the first black or mixed race president in Barack Obama, concerns regarding future gun control measures, illegal immigration, the economic downturn beginning in 2008, abortion controversy, and disgruntled military veterans' possible vulnerability to recruitment efforts by extremist groups as potential risk factors regarding right-wing extremism recruitment.

Napolitano made multiple apologies for offending veterans groups by the reference to veterans in the assessment, and promised to meet with those groups to discuss the issue. The Department of Homeland Security admitted a "breakdown in an internal process" by ignoring objections by the Office of Civil Rights and Civil Liberties to a portion of the document.

While the American Legion reportedly criticized the assessment, Glen M. Gardner Jr., the national commander of the 2.2 million-member Veterans of Foreign Wars, generally defended it, saying it "should have been worded differently" but served a vital purpose. "A government that does not assess internal and external security threats would be negligent of a critical public responsibility", he said in a statement.

==== Reaction to Northwest Airlines Flight 253 ====
Napolitano was criticized for stating in an interview with CNN's Candy Crowley that "the system worked" with regard to an attempted terrorist attack on Northwest Airlines Flight 253 approaching Detroit on Christmas Day 2009. She said:

What we are focused on is making sure that the air environment remains safe, that people are confident when they travel. And one thing I'd like to point out is that the system worked. Everybody played an important role here. The passengers and crew of the flight took appropriate action. Within literally an hour to 90 minutes of the incident occurring, all 128 flights in the air had been notified to take some special measures in light of what had occurred on the Northwest Airlines flight. We instituted new measures on the ground and at screening areas, both here in the United States and in Europe, where this flight originated. So the whole process of making sure that we respond properly, correctly and effectively went very smoothly.

She later went on NBC's Today Show with host Matt Lauer and admitted that the security system had indeed failed. She said that her earlier statement was "taken out of context" and maintained "air travel is safe", but admitted, "our system did not work in this instance" and no one "is happy or satisfied with that". Lauer then asked her whether the system failed up until the moment the bomber had tried to blow up the plane, and Napolitano answered: "It did [fail]."

In response to the NW253 bomb attempt, Napolitano instituted emergency enhanced pat-down screening until airport security technology could be deployed that could detect non-metallic explosives. After full body scanners were deployed, the enhanced pat-downs were used selectively on passengers who triggered an alarm when passing through the detection equipment.

==== TSA PreCheck and Global Entry ====
To reduce the time consumed by airport security checks Napolitano created the popular program TSA PreCheck, which allows travelers to provide background information about themselves to the Transportation Security Administration (TSA) in return for expedited security screening. TSA PreCheck reduces the number of unknown passengers arriving at security screening lines in airports. She also expanded the U.S. Customs and Border Protection trusted traveler program, Global Entry, to include more American travelers and some from verified partners abroad.

==== Secure Communities ====
Secure Communities, or SComm, is a deportation program managed by U.S. Immigration and Customs Enforcement, a subdivision of Homeland Security. Napolitano came under scrutiny for contradicting herself about whether the program is voluntary or mandatory for local jurisdictions. On September 7, 2010, Napolitano said in a letter to Congresswoman Zoe Lofgren that jurisdictions that wished to withdraw from the program could do so. However, in October 2010 a Washington Post article quoted an anonymous senior ICE official saying: "Secure Communities is not based on state or local cooperation in federal law enforcement ... State and local law enforcement agencies are going to continue to fingerprint people and those fingerprints are forwarded to FBI for criminal checks. ICE will take immigration action appropriately."

Napolitano later modified her position: "What my letter said was that we would work with them on the implementation in terms of timing and the like ... But we do not view this as an opt-in, opt-out program." At the same time Arlington, Virginia passed a resolution to opt out of SComm. A DHS employee commented at a policy conference: "Have we created some of the confusion out there? Absolutely we have."

==== Border security ====
Under Napolitano's leadership, the DHS invested heavily in border security and border security technology. These investments included a border security supplement passed by Congress to fund an increase in technology and infrastructure along the southern border with Mexico. This technology was used to replace Boeing's SBI Net, which was widely criticized as expensive and dysfunctional.

==== Printer bomb attempt ====
After the 2010 transatlantic aircraft bomb plot, which used printer cartridges to conceal bombs, Napolitano issued a ban for toner and ink cartridges weighing more than one pound on passenger flights.

==== Walmart–DHS partnership ====
On December 6, 2010, Walmart announced it was partnering with the DHS. The partnership included a video message from Napolitano on TV screens in Walmart stores playing a "public service announcement" to ask customers to report suspicious activity to a Walmart manager. Napolitano compared the undertaking to "the Cold War fight against communists".

==== Tucson memorial ====
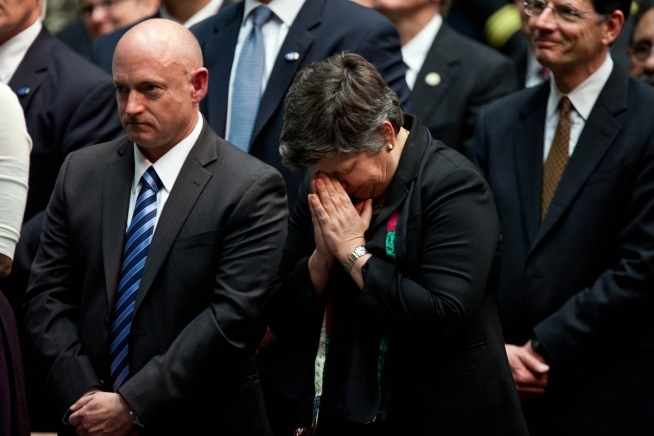
Napolitano stands next to Mark Kelly, husband of shooting survivor Gabby Giffords, at the memorial event.

On January 12, 2011, together with President Barack Obama, Napolitano was one of the speakers selected to express sympathy to the community of Tucson, the State of Arizona, and the rest of the nation in a televised memorial for the 2011 Tucson shooting.

==== Discrimination lawsuit ====
In July 2012, Napolitano was accused of allowing discrimination against male staffers within the Department of Homeland Security. The federal discrimination lawsuit, filed in the United States District Court for the District of Columbia, was filed by James Hayes Jr., at the time a special agent of Immigration and Customs Enforcement (ICE) in New York City. The suit alleged that managers Dora Schriro and Suzanne Barr mistreated male staffers, and that promotions were given to women who were friends of Napolitano. The suit also claimed that when the abuse was reported to the Equal Employment Opportunity office Napolitano launched a series of misconduct investigations against the reporting party, Hayes. This allegation was never proven. The spokesperson for ICE declined to comment on "unfounded claims".

Suzanne Barr, who was one of Napolitano's first appointments after she became secretary in 2009, went on leave after Hayes filed his lawsuit and resigned on September 1, 2012. She called the allegations in the lawsuit "unfounded". In November 2012, Hayes' attorney said that the "parties have come to an agreement in principle" to settle the case for $175,000 plus a settlement that would include other conditions, including Hayes keeping his job.

Napolitano was also sued by an Immigration and Customs Enforcement agent who claims he was pulled from his post at JFK Airport after making a series of employment-discrimination complaints.

==== DACA and comprehensive immigration reform ====
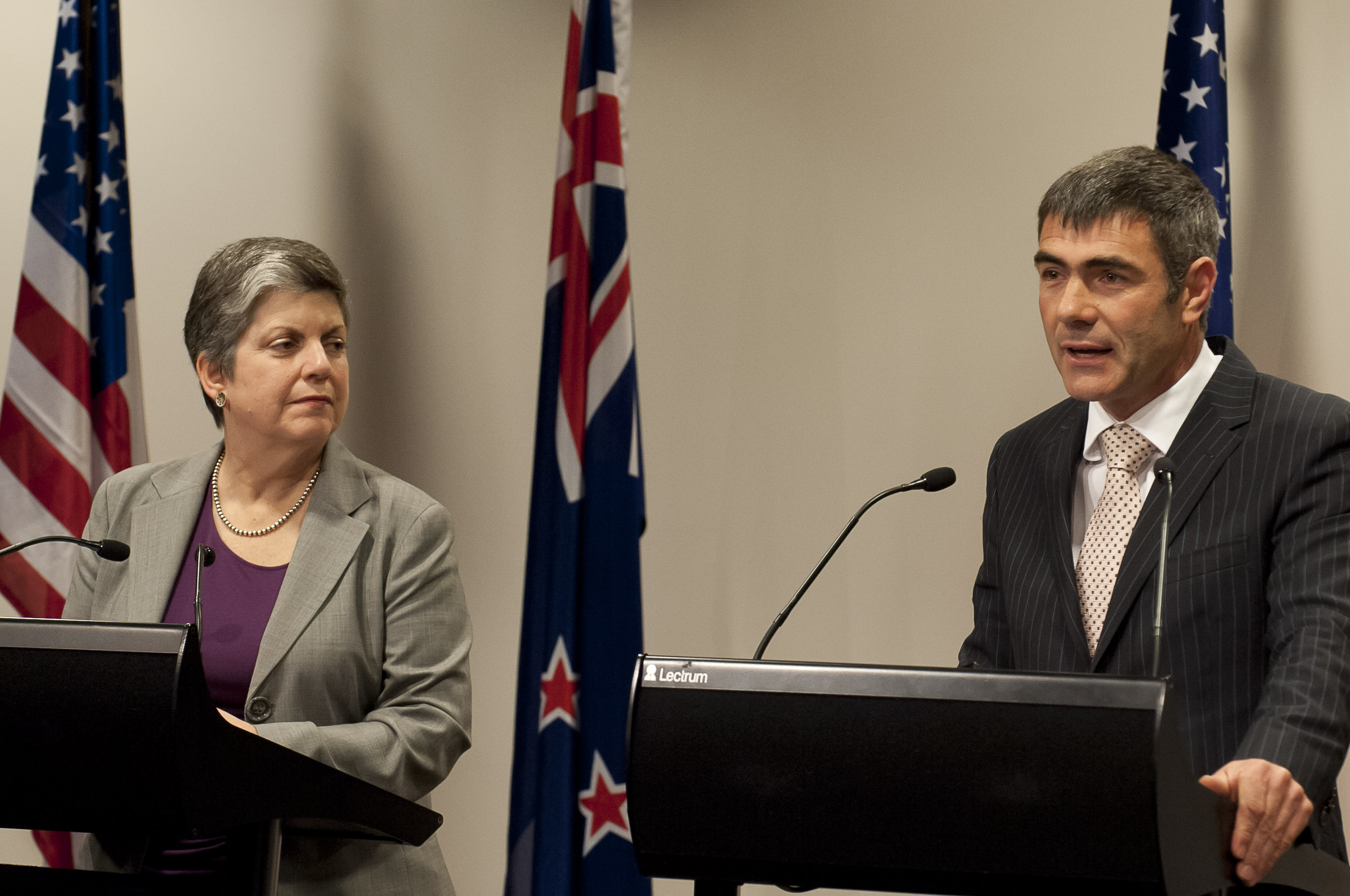
Janet Napolitano visit to New Zealand in 2012

Napolitano was a long-term advocate for comprehensive immigration reform, starting with her terms as governor of Arizona. In 2012, in an effort to provide relief for the so-called DREAM Act population, or DREAMers, Napolitano used prosecutorial discretion to create the Deferred Action for Childhood Arrivals program (DACA). DREAMers were brought to the U.S. by their parents as minors and have no experience of living in their countries of citizenship. The program deferred removal proceedings against DREAMers, providing them with the legal status to remain in the United States without fear of deportation.

DACA was announced by President Obama in a Rose Garden ceremony shortly after its creation. It was criticized by some members of Congress as an abuse of executive authority. Napolitano's successor, Jeh Johnson, later attempted to expand the program to include parents of DREAMers, but that expansion was subsequently overturned in courts. As of 2019 DACA remains in place and has never been found unconstitutional by a U.S. court.

== President of the University of California (2013–2020) ==
In July 2013, Napolitano announced she would leave her post as Secretary of Homeland Security to become president of the University of California (UC). She was appointed the 20th president by the University of California Board of Regents on July 18, 2013, the first woman to lead the University of California, and began her tenure as president on September 30, 2013. But before Napolitano's confirmation, there were protested by the immigration rights advocates as "they were among dozens of demonstrators who contended that Napolitano was the wrong person to lead an institution with so many students from around the world", and citing a poor record on immigrant rights and a lack of academic credentials. On September 18, 2019, Napolitano announced her resignation as president, effective August 1, 2020.

Among her first acts as president was the allocation of more support for UC's undocumented students, and expanded efforts to diversify the ranks of UC graduate students and post-doctoral researchers. She also initiated an ambitious ongoing plan for the ten-campus system to achieve carbon neutrality by 2025, saying that it was a 'moral imperative' for UC to find solutions to global climate change. In seeking to reduce UC's carbon footprint to zero, Napolitano authorized the university to register as an Electric Service Provider, allowing it to supply energy directly to some of its campuses and medical centers from an 80-MW solar farm in Fresno. In 2017, Napolitano was awarded the Pat Brown Award from the California Council for Environmental and Economic Balance for her environmental leadership.

Napolitano has used her tenure as president to encourage more students to pursue public interest careers. She created a fund for fellowships for undergraduate students to offset costs related to public service internships in Sacramento and Washington D.C. She also created the President's Public Service Law Fellowship program, which awards $4.5 million annually to law students at UC Berkeley, UC Davis, UC Irvine and UCLA to make postgraduate work and summer positions more accessible for students who wish to pursue public interest legal careers but might be forced to seek private sector jobs out of financial need.

As part of her Global Food Initiative, which was launched in 2014, Napolitano committed $3.3 million to help students at the University of California access nutritious food. At the time it was the nation's most comprehensive, systematic plan to tackle the problem of food insecurity.

Napolitano led efforts to combat sexual violence and harassment at the University of California through improvements to the system's policies and procedures. On March 7, 2014 Napolitano wrote a letter to the UC community announcing a new presidential policy prohibiting sexual harassment and violence and providing support for victims and training for faculty, staff and students. She also created a system-wide Title IX office and appointed the first system-wide Title IX coordinator in January 2017.

On October 26, 2017 the University of California announced the establishment of the National Center for Free Speech and Civic Engagement. Chaired by Napolitano, the center is devoted to research, education and advocacy on issues of free speech and civic engagement.

During Napolitano's time as president of UC, tuition for undergraduates held steady, with one tuition increase of $282 in 2017.

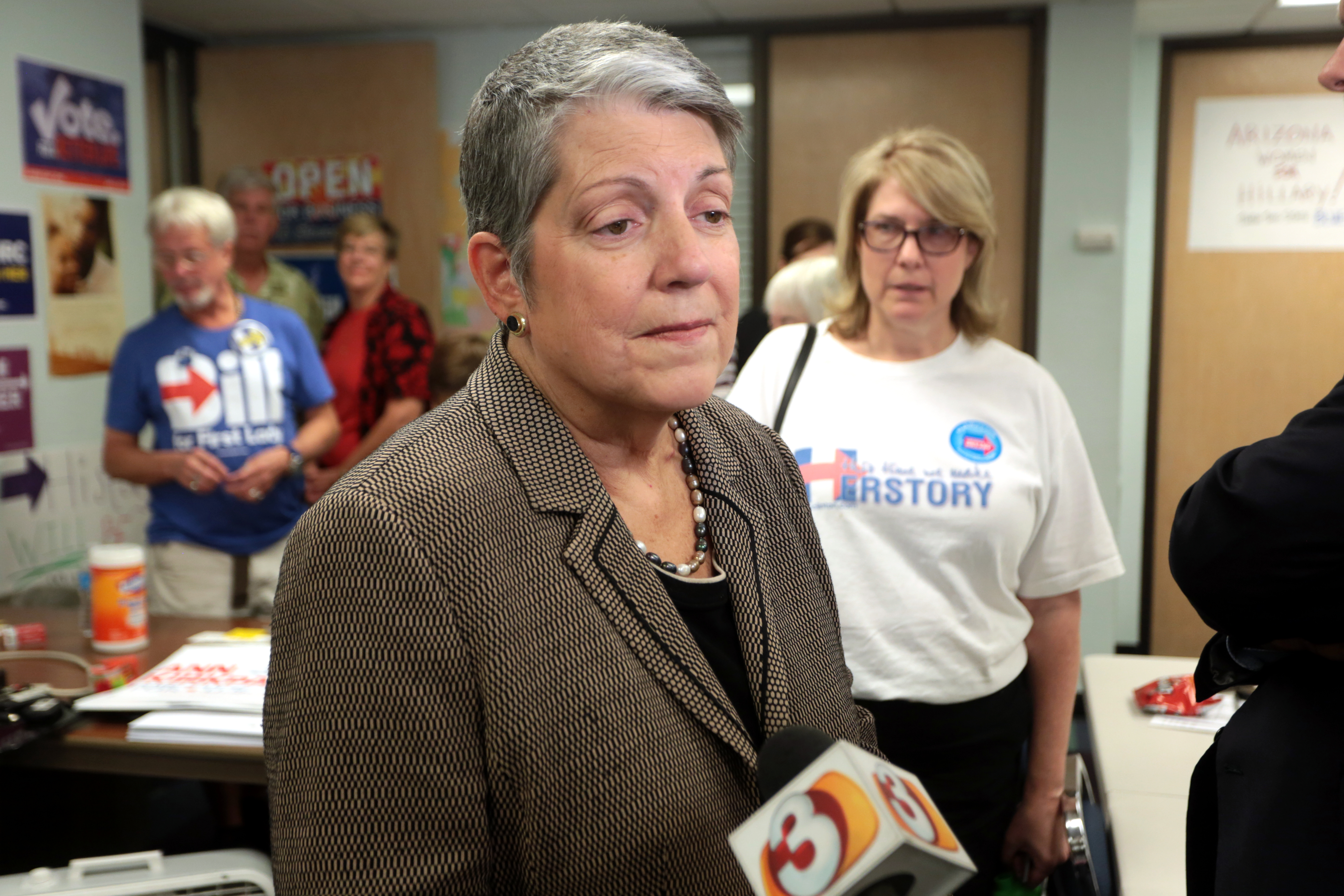
Napolitano campaigning for Hillary Clinton in Phoenix, Arizona on October 30, 2016.

=== Controversies ===
In April 2016, Napolitano placed Linda Katehi, the chancellor of the University of California, Davis, on administrative leave following revelations that UC Davis attempted to suppress web searches relating to the UC Davis pepper spray incident, as well as charges of nepotism and allegation of misuse of student funds.

On April 25, 2017 the California State Auditor issued a report that Janet Napolitano and her University of California Office of the President failed to disclose $175 million and engaged in misleading budget practices. After an investigation, the University of California took disciplinary action against Napolitano, issuing a public admonishment. According to an independent report by retired State Supreme Justice Carlos R. Moreno, Napolitano approved a plan that pressured the ten UC campuses to change their survey responses about Napolitano's administration from negative responses to positive ones.

On September 8, 2017 the University of California and Janet Napolitano filed a lawsuit against the United States Federal Government in response to President Donald Trump's decision to ultimately end the Deferred Action for Childhood Arrivals or DACA, making her the first former secretary of homeland security to sue the agency she once led over a policy that she created.

In 2020, Janet Napolitano fired 82 University of California, Santa Cruz graduate students for withholding grades in a wildcat strike for a Cost of Living Adjustment to address living conditions. Dismissed students faced loss of tuition remission, health benefits, and living stipends and international students faced loss of student visa status.

== Later career (2020–present) ==
Napolitano was repeatedly discussed as a contender for appointment to the U.S. Supreme Court. Some political commentators also suggested a possible candidacy in the 2016 United States presidential election. In September 2014, when Attorney General Eric Holder announced his intention to step down, there was speculation that Napolitano might be a candidate for the next United States attorney general. Instead, Loretta Lynch replaced Holder.

Napolitano serves as an advisor on the COVID-19 Technology Task Force, a technology industry coalition founded in March 2020 collaborating on solutions to respond to and recover from the COVID-19 pandemic.

After stepping down as president of the University of California, Napolitano continued to be a UC Berkeley faculty member within the Goldman School of Public Policy. In 2021, she founded and became the director of the Center for Security in Politics.

In May 2022, Napolitano was appointed to serve as a member of the President's Intelligence Advisory Board.

== Personal life ==
Napolitano is an avid basketball fan and regularly plays tennis and softball. Whitewater rafting and hiking are among her hobbies. She has hiked in Arizona's Superstition Mountains, New Mexico's Sandia Mountains, and the Himalayas, and has climbed Mount Kilimanjaro.

Napolitano has never married and has no children; as a result, some of her political opponents have speculated about her sexual orientation. In 2002, "vote gay" fliers were posted next to her campaign signs. Napolitano responded by saying that she is "just a straight, single workaholic".

Napolitano began undergoing cancer-related treatment in August 2016. On January 17, 2017, Napolitano was hospitalized in Oakland due to complications from the cancer treatment. She was released from hospital on January 23.

== Electoral history ==
1998 Arizona attorney general election
Party	Candidate	Votes	%	±%
Democratic	Janet Napolitano	509,516	50.4	+2.9
Republican	Tom McGovern	479,785	47.5	
Libertarian	Thomas Eblen	21,478	2.1	
Democratic gain from Republican		Swing		

Arizona gubernatorial election 2002
Party	Candidate	Votes	%	±%
Democratic	Janet Napolitano	566,284	46.2	+1.0
Republican	Matt Salmon	554,465	45.2	
Independent	Richard D. Mahoney	84,947	6.9	
Libertarian	Barry Hess	20,356	1.7	
Democratic gain from Republican		Swing		

Arizona gubernatorial election 2006
Party	Candidate	Votes	%	±%
Democratic	Janet Napolitano (incumbent)	959,830	62.6	+16.4
Republican	Len Munsil	543,528	35.4	
Libertarian	Barry Hess	30,268	2.0	
Democratic hold		Swing		

== See also ==
- AHCCCS: Arizona Health Care Cost Containment System (state Medicaid program)
- AIMS: Arizona's Instrument to Measure Standards (state standardized test for high school students)
- Arizona-Mexico Commission
- Barack Obama Supreme Court candidates
- List of female United States Cabinet members
- List of female state attorneys general in the United States
- List of female governors in the United States
- Protect Arizona Now: Proposition 200

Legal offices
Preceded by Grant Woods	Attorney General of Arizona; 1999–2003	Succeeded by Terry Goddard
Party political offices
Preceded by Paul Johnson	Democratic nominee for Governor of Arizona; 2002, 2006	Succeeded by Terry Goddard
Political offices
Preceded by Jane Dee Hull	Governor of Arizona; 2003–2009	Succeeded by Jan Brewer
Preceded by Mike Huckabee	Chair of National Governors Association; 2006–2007	Succeeded by Tim Pawlenty
Preceded by Michael Chertoff	United States Secretary of Homeland Security; 2009–2013	Succeeded by Jeh Johnson
Academic offices
Preceded by Mark Yudof	President of the University of California System; 2013–2020	Succeeded by Michael V. Drake
U.S. order of precedence (ceremonial)
Preceded by Eric Shinseki as Former U.S. Cabinet Member	Order of precedence of the United States as Former U.S. Cabinet Member	Succeeded by Ray LaHood as Former U.S. Cabinet Member
