= Joe Lane (Arizona politician) =

American politician (1935–2014)

Joseph James Lane III (August 3, 1935 – March 6, 2014) was an American politician.

Lane was born in Roswell, New Mexico. In 1940, he moved to Arizona where his grandfather has his ranch O Bar O Ranch near Willcox, Arizona, in Bonita, Arizona. Lane went to elementary school in Willcox, Arizona and to the New Mexico Military Institute in Roswell, New Mexico. He received his bachelor's degree in agriculture from the University of Arizona. Lane served in the United States Army, from 1957 until 1960, and was commissioned a first lieutenant. Lane owned cattle ranches in New Mexico, Colorado, and Arizona. He served in the Arizona House of Representatives, as a Republican, from 1979 to 1989 and was speaker from 1987 to 1989. He died in Tucson, Arizona from Parkinson's disease.
