= List of works about Rembrandt =

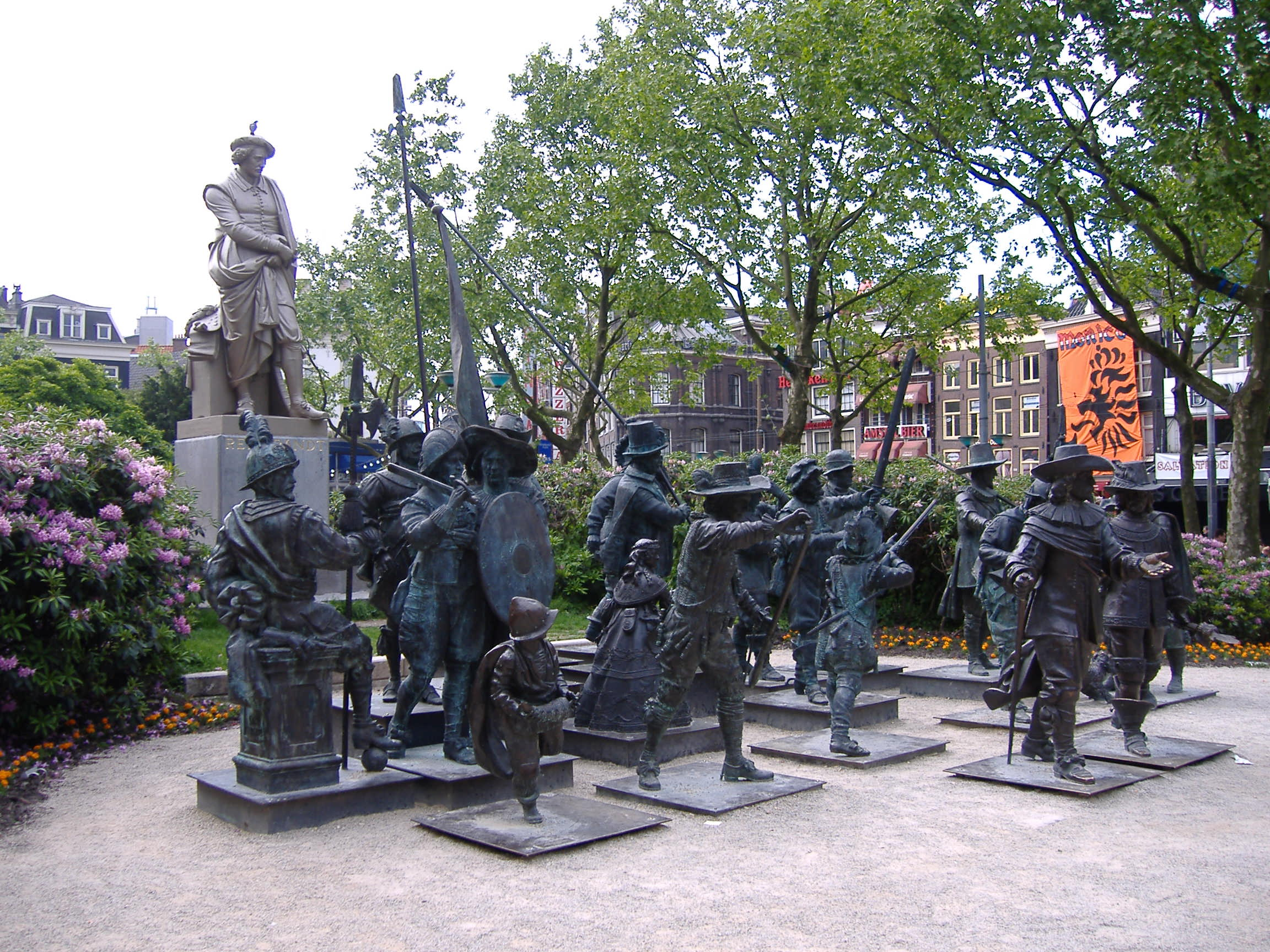
Rembrandt statue and the sculptures of The Night Watch in 3D at the Rembrandtplein in Amsterdam

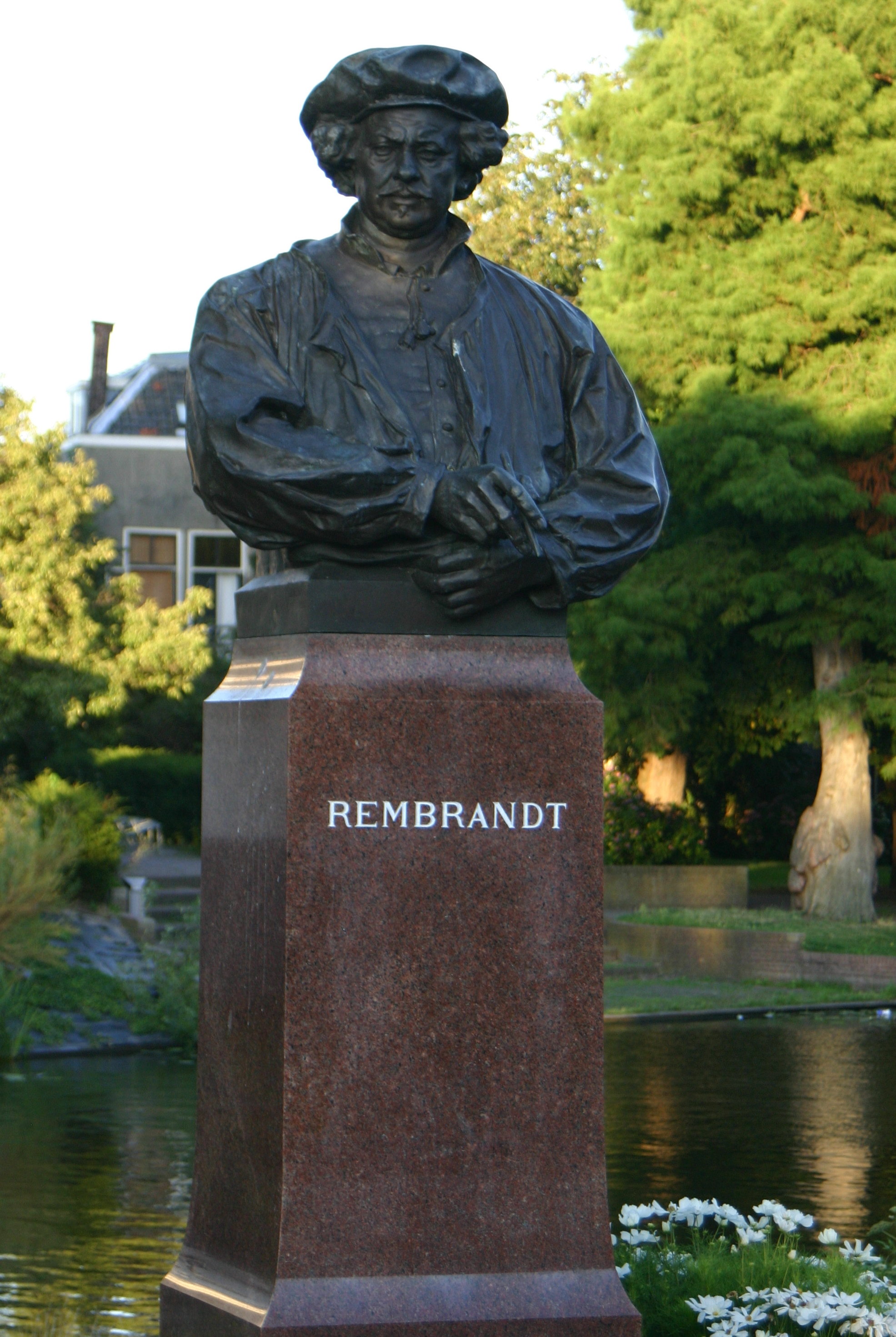
Rembrandt statue in Leiden

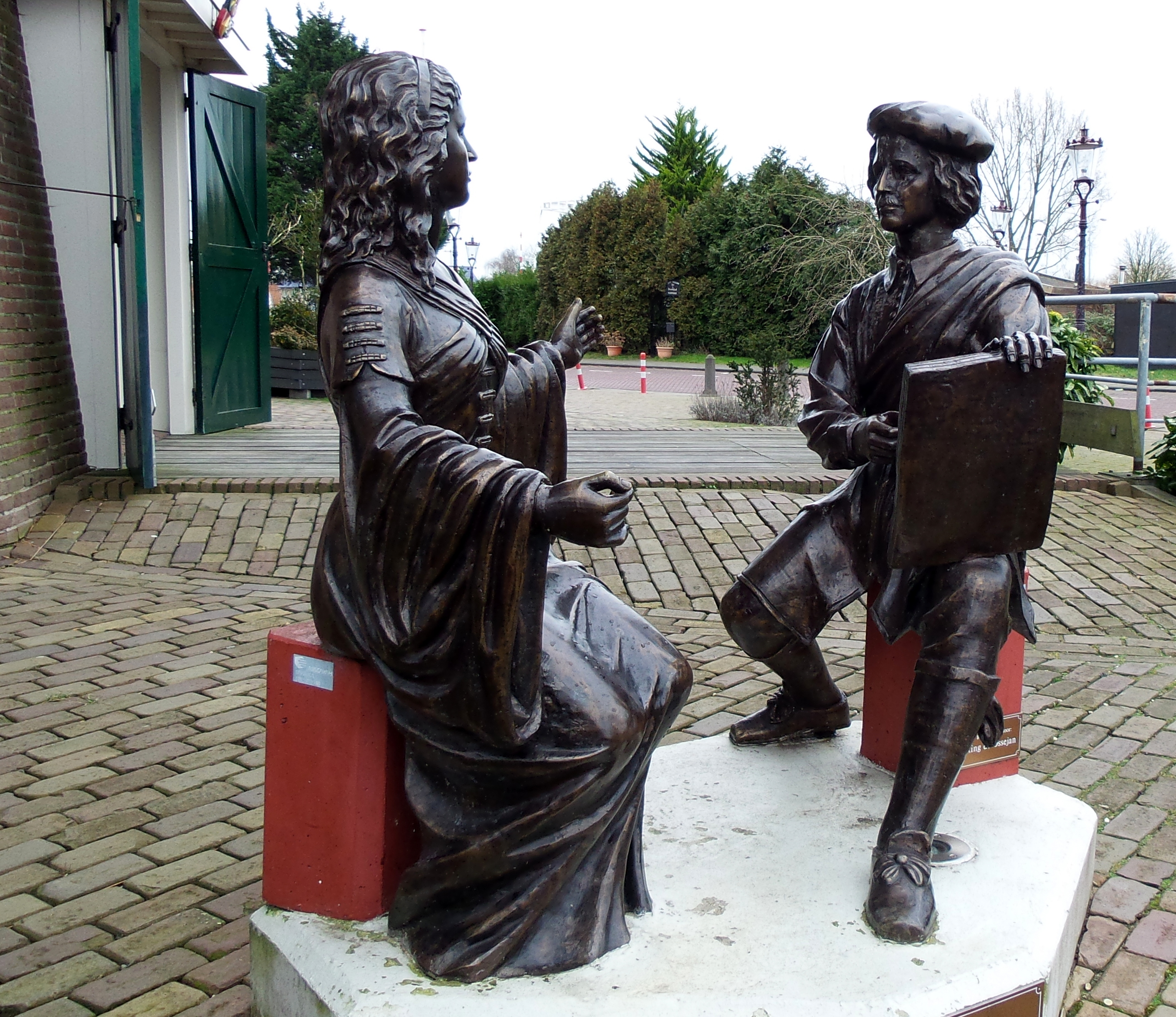
Rembrandt and Saskia

Rembrandt Harmenszoon van Rijn (1606–1669) is one of the most famous, controversial, and one of the best expertly researched (visual) artists in history.

For a visual artist in general and an Old Master in particular, Rembrandt has been the subject of a vast amount of literature that includes both fiction and nonfiction works.

The academic field of Rembrandt studies (the study of Rembrandt's life and work, including works by his pupils and followers) features noted Rembrandt connoisseurs and scholars, and has been described as a dynamic research area of Netherlandish art history.

In the history of the reception and interpretation of Rembrandt's art, the 'rediscovery' of the Dutch master in 19th-century France and Germany helped in establishing his reputation in subsequent times.

The following is a list of works about Rembrandt.

== Nonfiction works ==
=== Books, dissertations and theses ===
==== Biography ====
- Abbing, Michiel Roscam: Rembrandt: Leven en werk van de grootste schilder aller tijden. (Utrecht: Kosmos-Z&K, 2006) [in Dutch]
- Abbing, Michiel Roscam; Graaff, Arthur: Rembrandt voor Dummies. (Amsterdam: Addison Wesley, 2006) [in Dutch]
- Avermaete, Roger: Rembrandt et son temps. (Paris: Payot, 1952) [in French]
- Baudiquey, Paul: La vie et l'œuvre de Rembrandt. (Paris: ACR-Vilo, 1984) [in French]
- Bell, Malcolm: Rembrandt van Rijn and His Work. (London: G. Bell, 1899)
- Bikker, Jonathan: Rembrandt: Biografie van een rebel. (Rotterdam: Nai010 Uitgevers, 2019) [in Dutch]
- Bikker, Jonathan: Rembrandt: Biography of a Rebel. (Rotterdam: Nai010 Publishers, 2019) ISBN 9789462084759
- Blankert, Albert (ed.): Rembrandt: A Genius and His Impact. (Melbourne: National Gallery of Victoria, 1997)
- Blom, Onno: De jonge Rembrandt. (Amsterdam: De Bezige Bij, 2019) ISBN 9789403167503 [in Dutch]
- Blom, Onno: Young Rembrandt. Translated from the Dutch by Beverley Jackson. (London: Pushkin Press, 2019)
- Bockemühl, Michael: Rembrandt. (Cologne: Taschen, 2001)
- Bockemühl, Michael: Rembrandt basismonografie. (Kerkdriel: Librero Nederland B.V., 2017) ISBN 9783836540629 [in Dutch]
- Boeck, Wilhelm: Rembrandt. (Stuttgart: Kohlhammer Verlag, 1962) [in German]
- Bolten, J.; Bolten-Rempt, H.: The Hidden Rembrandt. Translated from the Dutch by Danielle Adkinson. (Chicago, IL: Rand McNally & Co., 1977)
- Bonnier, Henry: L'univers de Rembrandt. (Paris: Henri Scrépel, 1969) [in French]
- Bonnier, Henry: Rembrandt [Great Draughtsmen]. Translated from the French by Victoria Benedict. (New York: George Braziller; London: Pall Mall, 1970)
- Brion, Marcel: Rembrandt. (Paris: Éditions Albin Michel, 1946) [in French]
- Brons, Ingrid S.; Postma, Annemarie (eds.): Rembrandt in Leiden. Portret van een schildersjongen en zijn stad [Rembrandt in Leiden. A young painter and his city]. ('s-Hertogenbosch: Uitgeverij Heinen, 2006) ISBN 90-77721-73-8 [in Dutch]
- Bréal, Auguste: Rembrandt: A Critical Essay. (London: Duckworth, 1902)
- Brown, Gerard Baldwin: Rembrandt: A Study of His Life and Work. (London: Duckworth and Co., 1907)
- Büttner, Nils: Rembrandt, licht und schatten. Eine biographie. (Stuttgart: Reclam, 2014) ISBN 978-3-15-010965-6 [in German]
- Büttner, Nils: Rembrandt: De schilder van licht en schaduw. (Amsterdam: J. M. Meulenhoff, 2019) [in Dutch]
- Cabanne, Pierre: Rembrandt [Profils de l'art]. (Paris: Chêne, 1991) [in French]
- Cassou, Jean: Rembrandt [coll. "Ars Mundi"]. (Paris: Éditions Aimery Somogy, 1952) [in French]
- Cassou, Jean: Rembrandt ou la peinture de l'infini. (Paris: Amiot-Dumont, 1954) [in French]
- Descargues, Pierre: Rembrandt. (Paris: J.-C. Lattès, 1990) [in French]
- Field, D.M.: Rembrandt. (Rijswijk: Atrium, 2006) [in Dutch]
- Focillon, Henri: Rembrandt [Editions d'Histoire et d'art]. (Paris: Librairie Plon, 1936) [in French]
- Focillon, Henri: Rembrandt: Paintings, Drawings and Etchings. Translated from the French by Ludwig Goldscheider. (New York: Phaidon, 1960)
- Fowkes, Charles: The Life of Rembrandt. (London: The Hamlyn Publishing Group, 1978)
- Furió Galí, Vicenç: Rembrandt: Genio del grabado. (Barcelona: Publicacions i Edicions de la Universitat de Barcelona, 2018) [in Catalan]
- García Sánchez, Laura: Géniové umění: Rembrandt. (Praha: SUN, 2008)
- Haak, Bob: Rembrandt, zijn leven, zijn werk, zijn tijd. (Amsterdam: Contact, 1968) [in Dutch]
- Haak, Bob: Rembrandt: His Life, His Work, His Times. Translated from the Dutch by Elizabeth Willems-Treeman. (New York: Harry N. Abrams, 1969)
- Hamann, Richard: Rembrandt. (Berlin: Safari-Verlag, 1948) [in German]
- Hunt, Patrick: Rembrandt: His Life in Art [2nd ed.]. (New York: Ariel Books, 2007)
- Kitson, Michael: Rembrandt, 3rd ed. (Oxford: Phaidon, 1982)
- Knuttel, Gerhardus: Rembrandt, de meester en zijn werk. (Amsterdam: Ploegsma, 1956) [in Dutch]
- Laneyrie-Dagen, Nadeije: Lire la peinture de Rembrandt. (Paris: Larousse, 2006) [in French]
- Mee, Charles L.: Rembrandt's Portrait: A Biography. (New York: Simon & Schuster, 1990)
- Michel, Émile: Rembrandt. Sa vie, son œuvre et son temps. (Paris: Hachette, 1893) [in French]
- Michel, Émile: Rembrandt, His Life, His Work, and His Time, 2 vols. Translated from the French by Florence Simmonds. (London: Heinemann, 1894)
- Muller, Joseph-Emile: Rembrandt. (Paris: Aimery Somogy; London: Thames & Hudson, 1968)
- Muther, Richard: Rembrandt. Ein Künstlerleben. (Berlin: Fleischel, 1904) [in German]
- Muther, Richard: Rembrandt. (Hamburg: SEVERUS Verlag, 2012) [in German]
- Neumann, Carl: Rembrandt. (Berlin: W. Spemann, 1902) [in German]
- Neumann, Carl: Rembrandt [2nd ed.]. (Berlin: W. Spemann, 1905) [in German]
- Neumann, Carl: Rembrandt [3rd ed., 2 vols.]. (Munich: F. Bruckmann, 1922) [in German]
- Nigg, Walter: Rembrandt: Maler des Ewigen. (Zürich: Diogenes Verlag, 2006) ISBN 9783257065329 [in German]
- Ormiston, Rosalind: Rembrandt: His Life & Works in 500 Images. (London: Lorenz Books, 2012)
- Partsch, Susanna: Rembrandt. (London: Weidenfeld and Nicolson, 1991)
- Pächt, Otto: Rembrandt. (Munich: Prestel Verlag, 1991) [in German]
- Roger-Marx, Claude: Rembrandt. (Paris: Pierre Tisné Éditeur, 1960) [in French]
- Roger-Marx, Claude: Rembrandt. Translated by W.J. Strachan and Peter Simmons. (New York: Universe Books, 1960)
- Schmidt-Degener, F.: Rembrandt: Een beschrijving van zijn leven en zijn werk. (Amsterdam: G. Schreuders, 1906) [in Dutch]
- Schwartz, Gary: De Grote Rembrandt. (Zwolle: Waanders, 2006) [in Dutch]
- Schwartz, Gary: The Rembrandt Book. (New York: Harry N. Abrams, 2006)
- Schwartz, Gary: Rembrandt's Universe: His Art, His Life, His World. (London: Thames & Hudson, 2006)
- Schwartz, Gary: Meet Rembrandt: Life and Work of the Master Painter. (New Haven, CT: Yale University Press, 2010)
- Smith, Baige Elise: Rembrandt's Anatomy Lessons, diss., (The University of Western Australia, 2010)
- Tümpel, Christian: Rembrandt. Translated by Jacques and Jean Duvernet, Léon Karlson and Patrick Grilli. (Paris: Éditions Albin Michel, 1986)
- Tümpel, Christian: Rembrandt [Rowohlts Monographien]. (Reinbek bei Hamburg: Rowohlt Taschenbuch Verlag, 2006) [in German]
- Van Loon, Hendrik Willem: The Life and Times of Rembrandt van Rijn. (New York: Garden City Publishing, 1930; New York: Horace Liveright, 1930)
- Verhaeren, Émile: Rembrandt, biographie critique. (Paris: H. Laurens, 1905) [in French]
- Veth, Jan: Rembrandts leven en kunst. (Amsterdam: H. J. W. Becht, 1941) [in Dutch]
- Von Sandrart, Joachim; Baldinucci, Filippo; Houbraken, Arnold: Lives of Rembrandt [Lives of the Artists]. Introduced by Charles Ford. (Los Angeles, CA: J. Paul Getty Museum, 2018) ISBN 978-1606065624
- Vosmaer, Carel: Rembrandt Hannensz van Ryn, sa vie et ses oeuvres. (The Hague, 1868) [in French]
- Weisbach, Werner: Rembrandt. (Berlin: Walter de Gruyter, 1926) [in German]
- Westermann, Mariët: Rembrandt. (London: Phaidon, 2000)
- White, Christopher: Rembrandt and His World. (London: Thames and Hudson, 1964)
- White, Christopher: Rembrandt. (New York: Thames & Hudson, 1984)
- Wright, Christopher: Rembrandt and His Art. (London & New York: Hamlyn, 1975)
- Wright, Christopher: Rembrandt. [Trad. de l'anglais par Paul Alexandre]. (Paris: Citadelles & Mazenod, 2000) [in French]
- Zuffi, Stefano: Rembrandt: Il più importante eretico della pittura. (Milan: Leonardo Arte, 1998) [in Italian]

==== General studies ====
- Adams, Ann Jensen: Public Faces and Private Identities in Seventeenth-Century Holland: Portraiture and the Production of Community. (Cambridge: Cambridge University Press, 2009) ISBN 978-0-521-44455-2
- Auerbach, Elissa Anderson: Re-forming Mary in Seventeenth-Century Dutch Prints. (Ph.D. diss, University of Kansas, 2009)
- Boschloo, Anton W. A.; et al. (eds.): Aemulatio: Imitation, Emulation and Invention in Netherlandish Art from 1500 to 1800: Essays in Honor of Eric Jan Sluijter. (Zwolle: Waanders, 2011)
- Carroll, Margaret D.: Painting and Politics in Northern Europe: Van Eyck, Bruegel, Rubens, and Their Contemporaries. (University Park, PA: Penn State University Press, 2008) ISBN 9780271029559
- Chambers, Emma: An Indolent and Blundering Art? The Etching Revival and the Redefinition of Etching in England, 1838–1892. (Aldershot: Ashgate, 1999)
- Chu, Petra Ten-Doesschate: French Realism and the Dutch Masters: The Influence of Dutch Seventeenth-Century Painting on the Development of French Painting between 1830 and 1870. (Utrecht: Haentjens Dekker & Gumbert, 1974)
- Corrigan, Karina H.; van Campen, Jan; Diercks, Femke; Blyberg, Janet C. (eds.): Asia in Amsterdam: The Culture of Luxury in the Golden Age. (Yale University Press, 2015) ISBN 9780300212877
- Cumming, Laura: A Face to the World: On Self-Portraits. (London: HarperPress, 2009) ISBN 9780007118434
- Dickey, Stephanie S.; Roodenburg, H. (eds.): The Passions in the Arts of the Early Modern Netherlands. (Zwolle: Waanders, 2010)
- Falkenburg, R. L.; de Jong, J.; Roodenburg, H.; Scholten, F. (eds.): Beeld en zelfbeeld in de Nederlandse kunst, 1550–1750 / Image and Self-Image in Netherlandish Art, 1550–1750 [Nederlands kunsthistorisch jaarboek, vol. 46]. (Zwolle: Waanders, 1995)
- Fleischer, Roland E.; Munshower, Susan Scott (eds.): The Age of Rembrandt: Studies in Seventeenth-Century Dutch Painting. (University Park, PA: University of Pennsylvania Press, 1988)
- Franits, Wayne (ed.): Looking at Seventeenth-Century Dutch Art: Realism Reconsidered. (Cambridge: Cambridge University Press, 1997)
- Franits, Wayne (ed.): The Ashgate Research Companion to Dutch Art of the Seventeenth Century. (Burlington, VT: Ashgate, 2016)
- Freedberg, David; de Vries, Jan (eds.): Art in History, History in Art: Studies in Seventeenth-century Dutch Culture. (Santa Monica: Getty Center for the History of Art and the Humanities, 1991)
- Fromentin, Eugène: Les maîtres d'autrefois. (Paris: Éditions Garnier Frères, 1972) [in French]
- Fromentin, Eugène: Rubens et Rembrandt. Les Maîtres d'autrefois. Préface d'Albert Thibaudet, rééd. (Tournai: Éditions Complexe, 1991) [in French]
- Fromentin, Eugène: The Masters of Past Time: Dutch and Flemish Painting from Van Eyck to Rembrandt. Translated from the French by Andrew Boyle, edited by H. Gerson. (London: Phaidon Press, 1948; Ithaca, N.Y.: Cornell University Press, 1981)
- Gasser, Manuel: Self-Portraits from the Fifteenth Century to the Present Day. Translated from the German by Angus Malcolm. (New York: Appleton-Century, 1963)
- Grijzenhout, Frans; van Veen, Henk (eds.): The Golden Age of Dutch Painting in Historical Perspective. (Cambridge, U.K.: Cambridge University Press, 1999)
- Hall, James: The Self-Portrait: A Cultural History. (London: Thames & Hudson, 2014)
- Hammer-Tugendhat, Daniela: Das Sichtbare und das Unsichtbare. Zur holländischen Malerei des 17. Jahrhunderts. (Cologne/Weimar/Vienna: Böhlau, 2009) ISBN 978-3-412-20446-4 [in German]
- Hammer-Tugendhat, Daniela: The Visible and the Invisible: on Seventeenth-century Dutch Painting. Translated from German by Margarethe Clausen. (Berlin: De Gruyter, 2015)
- Hedquist, Valerie Lind: The Passion of Christ in Seventeenth-Century Dutch Painting. (Ph.D. diss., University of Kansas, 1990)
- Helmers, Helmer J.; Janssen, Geert H. (eds.): The Cambridge Companion to the Dutch Golden Age [Cambridge Companions to Culture]. (Cambridge University Press, 2018) ISBN 978-1107172265
- Helsinger, Elizabeth; et al. (eds.): The "Writing" of Modern Life: The Etching Revival in France, Britain, and the U.S., 1850–1940. (Chicago: Smart Museum of Art, University of Chicago, 2008) ISBN 978-0-935573-45-9
- Hirschfelder, Dagmar: Tronie und Porträt in der niederländischen Malerei des 17. Jahrhunderts. (Berlin: Gebr. Mann Verlag, 2008) ISBN 978-3-7861-2567-9 [in German]
- Hirschfelder, Dagmar; Krempel, León (eds.): Tronies. Das Gesicht in der Frühen Neuzeit. (Berlin: Gebr. Mann Verlag, 2014) ISBN 978-3-7861-2694-2 [in German]
- Houbraken, Arnold: De Groote Schouburgh der Nederlantsche Konstschilders en Schilderessen, 3 vols. in 1. The Hague, 1753 (Reprint: Amsterdam, 1976) [in Dutch]
- Larsen, Erik; Davidson, Jane P.: Calvinistic Economy and 17th Century Dutch Art. (Lawrence: University of Kansas Publications, 1979)
- Montias, John Michael: Art at Auction in 17th Century Amsterdam. (Amsterdam: Amsterdam University Press, 2002)
- Morgenstein, Susan W.; Levine, Ruth L.: The Jews in the Age of Rembrandt. (Rockville, MD: The Judaic Museum of the Jewish Community Center of Greater Washington, 1981)
- Muller, Sheila D. (ed.): Dutch Art: An Encyclopedia. (New York: Garland Pub., 1997) ISBN 0-8153-0065-4
- Nevitt Jr., H. Rodney: Art and the Culture of Love in Seventeenth-Century Holland [Studies in Netherlandish Visual Culture, 2]. (Cambridge/New York: Cambridge UP, 2002) ISBN 0-521-64329-5
- Peaster, Sarah Grafton: A Calvinist View of Visual Art in Seventeenth-Century Holland: the Iconography of Esther in Post-Reformation Dutch Painting. (M.A. thesis, Louisiana State University and Agricultural and Mechanical College, 2013)
- Pescio, Claudio: Rembrandt and Seventeenth-Century Holland. Translated by Simon Knight. (New York: Peter Bedrick Books, 1995)
- Quodbach, Esmée (ed.): Holland's Golden Age in America: Celebrating the Art of Rembrandt, Vermeer, and Hals. (University Park, PA: Pennsylvania State University Press, 2014)
- Riegl, Alois: The Group Portraiture of Holland. Introduction by Wolfgang Kemp, translated from the German by Evelyn M. Kain and David Britt. (Los Angeles, CA: Getty Research Institute for the History of Art and the Humanities, 1999)
- Rosales-Rodríguez, Agnieszka: Śladami dawnych mistrzów. Mit Holandii złotego wieku w dziewiętnastowiecznej kulturze artystycznej [In the footsteps of old masters. The myth of Golden-Age Holland in nineteenth-century artistic culture]. (Warsaw: Wydawnictwa Uniwersytetu Warszawskiego, 2008) [in Polish]
- Rosales-Rodríguez, Agnieszka: In the Footsteps of the Old Masters: The Myth of Golden Age Holland in 19th Century Art and Art Criticism. Translated from the Polish by Klaudyna Michałowicz. (Peter Lang GmbH, 2016)
- Silver, Larry: Rembrandt's Holland [Renaissance Lives]. (London: Reaktion Books, 2018) ISBN 978-1780238470
- Sitt, Martina; et al.: Pieter Lastman. In Rembrandts Schatten? [exh. cat.]. (Hamburg: Hamburger Kunsthalle; Munich: Hirmer Verlag, 2006) ISBN 978-3-7774-2985-4 [in German]
- Sluijter, Eric Jan; et al.: Leidse fijnschilders: van Gerrit Dou tot Frans van Mieris de Jonge, 1630–1760. (Leiden: Stedelijk Museum De Lakenhal, 1988) [in Dutch]
- Smith, John: A Catalogue Raisonné of the Works of the Most Eminent Dutch, Flemish and French Painters [Volume VII, Rembrandt van Rhyn; Volume IX, Supplement]. (London: Smith & Son, 1836–42)
- Spicer, Joaneath; et al. (eds.): Masters of Light: Dutch Painters in Utrecht during the Golden Age. (New Haven, CT: Yale University Press, 1997)
- Tilkes, Olga (Kirillovna, Oljga): Istorii strany Rembrandta. (Moskva: Novoe literaturnoe obozrenie, 2018) [in Russian]
- Turner, Jane: Rembrandt to Vermeer: 17th-Century Dutch Artists [Grove Dictionary of Art]. (New York: St. Martin's Press, 2000)
- Von Bode, Wilhelm: Studien zur Geschichte der holländischen Malerei [Studies in the history of Dutch painting]. (Brunswick: Friedrich Viewege, 1883) [in German]
- Weisberg, Gabriel P.: The Etching Renaissance in France, 1850–1880 [exh. cat.]. (Salt Lake City: Utah Museum of Fine Arts, 1971)
- Weststeijn, Thijs; van den Doel, Marieke; van Eck, Natasja; Korevaar, Gerbrand; Tummers, Anna (eds.): The Learned Eye: Regarding Art, Theory, and the Artist's Reputation. Essays for Ernst van de Wetering. (Amsterdam: Amsterdam University Press, 2005) ISBN 90-5356-713-5
- Weststeijn, Thijs; Jorink, Eric; Scholten, Frits (eds.): Netherlandish Art in its Global Context [Nederlands Kunsthistorisch Jaarboek / Netherlands Yearbook for History of Art, 66]. (Leiden: Brill, 2016) ISBN 978-90-04-33497-7
- Wheelock, Arthur K. Jr.; Baer, Ronni (eds.): Gerard Dou, 1613–1675: Master Painter in the Age of Rembrandt. (New Haven, CT: Yale University Press, 2002)
- Yeazell, Ruth Bernard: Art of the Everyday: Dutch Painting and the Realist Novel. (Princeton, NJ: Princeton University Press, 2008) ISBN 978-0-691-12726-2
- Ziemba, Antoni: Iluzja a realizm. Gra z widzem w sztuce holenderskiej, 1580–1660. (Warsaw: Wydawnictwa Uniwersytetu Warszawskiego, 2005) [in Polish]
- Ziemba, Antoni: Illusion and Realism: The Game with the Spectator in Dutch Art, 1580–1660. Translated from the Polish by Krzysztof Kościuczuk. (Warsaw: Peter Lang, 2017)
- Zumthor, Paul: La vie quotidienne en Hollande au temps de Rembrandt. (Paris: Hachette, 1959) [in French]
- Zumthor, Paul: Daily Life in Rembrandt's Holland. Translated from the French by Simon Watson Taylor. (London: Weidenfeld and Nicolson, 1962)

==== Including exhibition catalogues (exh. cat.) ====
- Aartomaa, Ulla; et al. (eds.): Rembrandt: Master of the Copper Plate. (Helsinki: Sinebrychoff Art Museum, 2012)
- Abbing, Michiel Roscam: The Treasures of Rembrandt. (London: Carlton Publishing Group, 2006)
- Adhémar, Jean; et al. (eds.): Rembrandt, graveur: 350e anniversaire de sa naissance. (Paris: Bibliothèque Nationale, Galerie Mansart, 1956) [in French]
- Aldovini, Laura: Rembrandt. Incidere la luce. I capolavori della grafica. (Milan: Silvana Editoriale, 2012) [in Italian]
- Alexander-Knotter, Mirjam; Hillegers, Jasper; van Voolen, Edward: The ‘Jewish’ Rembrandt. The Myth Unravelled. [Cat. exh.; Joods Historisch Museum, Amsterdam, 10 November 2006 – 4 February 2007]. (Zwolle: Waanders; Amsterdam: Jewish Historical Museum, 2006) ISBN 978-90-400-8467-6
- Althaus, Karin: Rembrandt. Die Radierungen aus der Sammlung Eberhard W. Kornfeld. (Basel: Kunstmuseum Basel, 2005) [in German]
- Bacou, Roseline: Rembrandt et son temps. Dessins des collections publiques et privées conservées en France [cat. exp.]. (Paris: Musée du Louvre, Éditions de la Réunion des musées nationaux, 1970) [in French]
- Baer, Ronni: Class Distinctions: Dutch Painting in the Age of Rembrandt and Vermeer. With essays by Henk van Nierop, Herman Roodenburg, Eric Jan Sluijter, Marieke de Winkel, and Sanny de Zoete. Translated by Diane Webb. (Boston: Museum of Fine Arts, 2015) ISBN 978-0-87846-830-0
- Bahre, Kristin; et al. (eds.): Rembrandt. Genie auf der Suche. (Cologne: DuMont Literatur und Kunst, 2006) ISBN 3-8321-7694-2 [in German]
- Berg, Lars; Joch, Peter (eds.): Von Rembrandt bis Baselitz. Meisterwerke der Druckgrafik aus der Sammlung des Städtischen Museums Braunschweig. (Petersberg: Michael Imhof Verlag, 2020) [in German]
- Bevers, Holm: Rembrandt: Die Zeichnungen im Berliner Kupferstichkabinett [Kritischer Katalog]. (Ostfildern: Hatje Cantz, 2006) [in German]
- Bevers, Holm; Kettner, Jasper; Metze, Gudula (eds.): Rembrandt. Ein Virtuose der Druckgraphik. (Kupferstichkabinett, Staatliche Museen zu Berlin, 2006) [in German]
- Bevers, Holm: Rembrandt: Drawings from the Berlin Kupferstichkabinett. (Ostfildern: Hatje Cantz, 2007) ISBN 9783775719247
- Bevers, Holm; Rumberg, Per: Rembrandt's First Masterpiece [exh. cat.]. (New York: Morgan Library and Museum, 2016)
- Bialostocki, Jan; et al.: Jan Lievens. Ein Maler im Schatten Rembrandts. (Braunschweig: Herzog Anton Ulrich Museum, 1979) [in German]
- Bikker, Jonathan; Weber, Gregor J. M.; et al.: Rembrandt: The Late Works [National Gallery London]. (London: The National Gallery, 2014) ISBN 978-1857095579
- Bikker, Jonathan; Weber, Gregor J. M.; et al.: Rembrandt: Les années de plénitude. (Bruxelles: Fonds Mercator, 2014) [in French]
- Bikker, Jonathan; Weber, Gregor J. M.; et al.: Der späte Rembrandt. (München: Hirmer Verlag, 2014) [in German]
- Bisanz-Prakken, Marian: Drawings from the Albertina: Landscape in the Age of Rembrandt. (Alexandria, VA: Art Services International, 1995)
- Bisanz-Prakken, Marian: Rembrandt and his Time: Masterworks from the Albertina, Vienna [Cat. exh. Milwaukee Art Museum, 8 October 2005 – 8 January 2006]. (New York: Hudson Hills Press, 2005)
- Bisanz-Prakken, Marian; Schröder, Klaus Albrecht: Das Zeitalter Rembrandts [exh. cat.]. (Vienna: Graphische Sammlung Albertina; Ostfildern: Hatje Cantz, 2009) [in German]
- Black, Peter; Hermens, Erma: Rembrandt and the Passion. (Munich: Prestel, 2012)
- Blanc, Jan; et al.: Rembrandt et son entourage. (Paris: Éditions de l'École nationale supérieure des Beaux-Arts, 2012) [in French]
- Blankert, Albert (ed.): Gods, Saints and Heroes: Dutch Painting in the Age of Rembrandt [exh.cat.]. (Washington: National Gallery of Art, 1980)
- Blühm, Andreas; Hohn, Maike: Het geheim van Dresden: van Rembrandt tot Canaletto [The Secret of Dresden: from Rembrandt to Canaletto]. (Dresden: Staatliche Kunstsammlungen Dresden; Groningen: Groninger Museum, 2015) [in Dutch]
- Bomford, D.; Brown, C.; Roy, A.: Art in the Making: Rembrandt. (London: National Gallery, 1988)
- Broos, B.P.J.: Oude tekeningen in het bezit van de Gemeentemusea van Amsterdam waaronder de collectie Fodor [Deel 3]: Rembrandt en tekenaars uit zijn omgeving. (Amsterdam: Amsterdams Historisch Museum, 1981) [in Dutch]
- Broos, B.P.J.: Rembrandt en zijn voorbeelden [Rembrandt and his sources]. (Amsterdam: Museum Het Rembrandthuis, 1985) [in Dutch]
- Bruno, Silvia: Rembrandt nel Seicento olandese. (Milan: Il Sole, 2008) [in Italian]
- Bull, Duncan; Dibbits, Taco; et al.: Rembrandt—Caravaggio [exh. cat.]. (Amsterdam: Rijksmuseum, 2006)
- Cassinelli, Paola; Gramatica, Francesca de: Rembrandt e i capolavori della grafica europea nelle collezioni del Castello del Buonconsiglio. (Trento: Castello del Buonconsiglio, 2008) [in Italian]
- Cavalli-Björkman, Görel (ed.): Rembrandt och hans tid. Människan i centrum. En utställning ingående i Nationalmuseums 200-årsjubileum. (Stockholm: Nationalmuseum, 1992) [in Swedish]
- Clark, Kenneth; Ilchman, Frederick; Rosand, David: Rembrandt and the Venetian Influence. (New York: Salander-O'Reilly Galleries, 2000)
- Cohen, Janie: Rembrandt - Picasso: Prenten en tekeningen van Picasso geïnspireerd door werken van Rembrandt / Rembrandt - Picasso: Prints and drawings by Picasso inspired by works of Rembrandt. (Amsterdam: Museum Het Rembrandthuis, 1990) [in Dutch]
- Cooper, Tarnya; Bolland, Charlotte: The Encounter: Drawings from Leonardo to Rembrandt. (London: National Portrait Gallery, 2017)
- Crenshaw, Paul; Herndon-Consagra, Francesca: Rembrandt: Master Etchings from St. Louis Collections [exh. cat.]. (St. Louis, Missouri: St. Louis Art Museum, 2006)
- Czobor, Ágnes: Rembrandt und sein Kreis. (Budapest: Corvina Verlag, 1969) [in German]
- Cuzin, Jean-Pierre; Schmidt, Katharina; Raux, Sophie: Jean-Honoré Fragonard (1732–1806): Orígenes e influencias. De Rembrandt al siglo XXI. (Barcelona: Fundació Caixa de Pensions, 2006) [in Spanish]
- De Jongh, Eddy; Mireille, Cornelis; van Sloten, Leonore (eds.): In de ban van Hercules Segers: Rembrandt en de Modernen / Under the Spell of Hercules Segers: Rembrandt and the Moderns [exh. cat.]. (Zwolle: W Books; Amsterdam: Hercules Segers Stichting/Hercules Segers Foundation, 2016)
- De Viejo, Isadora Rose: Goya/Rembrandt: la mémoire de l'oeil [exposition au]. Cabinet des estampes du Musée d'art et d'histoire, Genève, 18 mai-12 septembre, 1993. (Genève: Musée d’Art et d'Histoire, 1993) [in French]
- De Viejo, Isadora Rose: Rembrandt en la memoria de Goya y Picasso, Obra gráfica. (Madrid: Fundación Carlos de Amberes / Fundación Bancaja / Ibercaja, 1999–2000) [in Spanish]
- De Viejo, Isadora Rose; Cohen, Janie: Etched on the Memory: The Presence of Rembrandt in the Prints of Goya and Picasso. (Blaricum: V KPub./Inmerc, 2000)
- De Viejo, Isadora Rose; Di Martino, Enzo: Rembrandt, ispirazioni per Goya [Rembrandt, an inspiration for Goya]. (Milan: Gabriele Mazzotta, 2001) [in Italian]
- De Witt, David; van Sloten, Leonore; van der Veen, Jaap: Rembrandts late leerlingen. In de leer bij een genie / Rembrandt's late pupils. Studying under a genius. [Cat. exh.; Museum Het Rembrandthuis Amsterdam, 12 February – 17 May 2015]. (Amsterdam: Museum Het Rembrandthuis; Houten: Terra Publishers, 2015) ISBN 978-90-8989-647-6 [in Dutch]
- De Witt, David; Noorman, Judith (eds.): Rembrandt's Naked Truth: Drawing Nude Models in the Golden Age [exh. cat., Rembrandt House Museum, Amsterdam]. (Zwolle, 2016)
- DeWitt, Lloyd; et al. (eds.): Rembrandt and the Face of Jesus. With a preface by Seymour Slive and contributions by Lloyd DeWitt, Blaise Ducos, Franziska Gottwald, George S. Keyes, Shelley Perlove, Larry Silver, Ken Sutherland and Mark Tucker. [Cat. exh.: Musée du Louvre, Paris, 21 April – 18 July 2011; Philadelphia Museum of Art, 3 August – 30 October 2011; Detroit Institute of Arts, 20 November 2011 – 12 February 2012.]. (Philadelphia: Philadelphia Museum of Art, 2011) ISBN 978-0-87633-227-6
- Dickey, Stephanie: Dutch Painting in the Age of Rembrandt from the Metropolitan Museum of Art. Introduction by Susan D. Kuretsky [exh. cat.]. (Hamilton, N.Y.: Picker Art Gallery, Colgate University, 1983)
- Dickey, Stephanie; Coutré, Jacquelyn N.; Brooke, Janet M.; Bakker, Piet: Leiden circa 1630: Rembrandt Emerges. (Kingston, Ontario: Agnes Etherington Art Centre, 2019)
- Diederen, Roger; Lange, Christiane (eds.): Das ewige Auge. Von Rembrandt bis Picasso. Meisterwerke der Sammlung Jan Krugier und Marie-Anne Krugier-Poniatowski [Ausstellungskatalog]. (München: Hirmer, 2007) ISBN 978-3-7774-3695-1 [in German]
- Diederen, Roger; Maaz, Bernhard; Koch, Ute Christina (eds.): Rembrandt - Tizian - Bellotto: Geist und Glanz der Dresdner Gemäldegalerie [Rembrandt – Titian – Bellotto: Spirit and Splendour of the Dresden Picture Gallery]. (München: Hirmer, 2014) [in German]
- Dittrich, Christian; Ketelsen, Thomas; et al. (eds.): Rembrandt: Die Dresdener Zeichnungen [Cat. exh. Kupferstich-Kabinett, Dresden, 7 August – 3 October 2004; Institut Néerlandais, Paris, 30 March – 21 May 2006]. (Cologne: Verlag der Buchhandlung Walther König, 2004) [in German]
- Döring, Thomas; Bungarten, Gisela; Page, Christiane: Aus Rembrandts Kreis. Die Zeichnungen des Braunschweiger Kupferstichkabinetts [From Rembrandt's Circle: Drawings from the Brunswick-Printroom]. (Petersberg: Michael Imhof Verlag, 2006) [in German]
- Ducos, Blaise; Surh, Dominique (eds.): Masterpieces of The Leiden Collection: The Age of Rembrandt [exh. cat.]. (Paris: Musée du Louvre, 2017)
- Dumas, Charles; Endedijk, Leo: Meesters en molens. Van Rembrandt tot Mondriaan. (Zwolle: Waanders, 2007) ISBN 9789040082917 [in Dutch]
- Duparc, Frederik J.: Landscape in Perspective: Drawings by Rembrandt and His Contemporaries. (Cambridge, Massachusetts: Arthur M. Sackler Museum, 1988)
- Eissenhauer, Michael (ed.): Rembrandt-Bilder. Die historische Sammlung der Kasseler Gemäldegalerie. (München: Hirmer, 2006) ISBN 978-3-7774-2995-3 [in German]
- Elen, Albert J.: Rembrandt in Rotterdam: Tekeningen van Rembrandt en zijn kring in het Museum Boijmans Van Beuningen / Rembrandt in Rotterdam: Drawings of Rembrandt and his circle in the Museum Boijmans Van Beuningen. (Rotterdam: Museum Boijmans van Beuningen, 2005) [in Dutch]
- Faietti, Marzia: I grandi maestri dell'incisione. Dürer, Rembrandt, Castiglione Genovese. (Bologna: Palazzo Pepoli Campogrande, 1983) [in Italian]
- Faietti, Marzia: Rembrandt e Morandi: mutevoli danze di segni incisi. (Bologna: Museo Morandi, 2006) [in Italian]
- Foucart, Jacques; Lacambre, Jean; et al. (eds.): Le Siècle de Rembrandt: Tableaux hollandais des collections publiques françaises [exposition]. (Paris: Musée du Petit Palais, 1970) [in French]
- Ganz, James A.: Rembrandt's Century. (Munich: Prestel, 2013) ISBN 978-3791352244
- Garton, Robin; Grimm, Gerard Volker; van der Grinten, Gerhard: Rembrandt und die englischen Malerradierer des 19. Jahrhunderts [Rembrandt and the English Painter-Etchers of the 19th Century]. (Bedburg-Hau: Stiftung Museum Schloss Moyland, 2005) [in German]
- Gilles, Matthieu; et al.: Rembrandt et les peintres-graveurs italiens de Castiglione à Tiepolo. (Épinal: Musée Départemental d'Art Ancient et Contemporain, 2003) [in French]
- Giltaij, Jeroen: The Drawings by Rembrandt and His School in the Museum Boymans-van Beuningen. (Rotterdam: Museum Boymans-van Beuningen, 1988)
- Grigsby, Thea: Rembrandt: Master Etcher. (Austin, TX: The Art Museum, The University of Texas at Austin, 1979)
- Groschner, Gabriele; Huber, Markus T.; Uhlir, Katharina: Rembrandt: unter der Farbe / Rembrandt: beneath the paint. (Salzburg: Residenzgalerie Salzburg, DomQuartier, 2016) [in German]
- Guégan, Stéphane; Madeline, Laurence; Schlesser, Thomas: L'autoportrait dans l'histoire de l'art: de Rembrandt à Warhol, l'intimité révélée de 50 artistes. (Boulogne-Billancourt: Beaux-arts éditions, 2009) [in French]
- Hall, James; Vaisse, Pierre; Ullrich, Wolfgang; et al. (eds.): Facing the World: Self-portraits from Rembrandt to Ai Weiwei. (Edinburgh: Scottish National Galleries; Cologne: Snoeck, 2016)
- Hautekeete, Stefaan; et al. (eds.): Tekeningen van Rembrandt en zijn leerlingen in de verzameling van Jean de Grez. (Brussels: Koninkijke Musea voor Schone Kunsten, 2005) [in Dutch]
- Haverkamp-Begemann, Egbert; Judson, J. Richard; Logan, Anne-Marie: Rembrandt after Three Hundred Years: An Exhibition of Rembrandt and His Followers. (Chicago: Art Institute of Chicago, 1969)
- Hess, Daniel: In Rembrandts Werkstatt: der Meister in Original, Kopie und Studie [In Rembrandt's studio: the master in the original, copy and study]. (Nürnberg: Germanisches Nationalmuseum, 2001) ISBN 3-926982-74-8 [in German]
- Hinterding, Erik; Manuth, Volker; et al.: Rembrandt en Jan Six. De ets, de vriendschap. (Amsterdam: Six Art Promotion, 2017) [in Dutch]
- Hoetink, H.R.; et al.: Rembrandt en zijn tijd [exhib. cat.]. (Brussels: Palais des Beaux Arts, 1971) [in Dutch]
- Kaiser, Franz Wilhelm; North, Michael (eds.): Die Geburt des Kunstmarktes. Rembrandt, Ruisdael, van Goyen und die Künstler des Goldenen Zeitalters. (München: Hirmer Verlag, 2017) [in German]
- Kann, Anne-Röver: In Rembrandts Manier: Kopie, Nachahmung und Aneignung in den graphischen Künsten des 18. Jahrhunderts, Ausst.-Kat. (Bremen: Kunsthalle Bremen, 1986) [in German]
- Ketelsen, Thomas; Röver-Kann, Anne: Rembrandt, oder nicht? [Katalog zur Ausstellung in der Hamburger Kunsthalle, 15. Oktober 2000 bis 21. Januar 2001]. (Ostfildern: Hatje Cantz, 2000) [in German]
- Kloek, Wouter; Jansen, Guido: Rembrandt in a New Light: Presentation of Seven Restored Paintings by Rembrandt. (Amsterdam: Rijksmuseum, 1993)
- Kofuku, Akira; et al. (eds.): Rembrandt: The Quest for Chiaroscuro. (Tokyo: Nippon Television Network Corporation, 2011) ISBN 9784906536580
- Kolfin, Elmer; Runia, Epco (eds.): Black in Rembrandt's Time. [Exh. cat., The Rembrandt House Museum, Amsterdam, March 5 – May 31, 2020, extended to September 10, 2020]. (Zwolle: Uitgeverij WBooks, 2020)
- Kuretsky, Susan Donahue; et al.: Etchings by Rembrandt from the S. William Pelletier Collection. (Ithaca, NY: Herbert F. Johnson Museum of Art, 2004)
- Lambert, Gisèle; Santiago Páez, Elena María: Rembrandt, la luz de la sombra [Rembrandt, the light of the shade]. (Barcelona: Fundació Caixa de Catalunya, 2005) [in Spanish]
- Lammertse, F.; van der Veen, J.: Uylenburgh & Zoon: Kunst en commercie van Rembrandt tot De Lairesse, 1625–1675 [Uylenburgh & Son: Art and commerce from Rembrandt to De Lairesse, 1625–1675]. [Cat. exh. Dulwich Picture Gallery, London, 7 June – 3 September 2007; Museum Het Rembrandthuis, Amsterdam, 14 September – 10 December 2006]. (Zwolle: Waanders, 2006) ISBN 9040081646 [in Dutch]
- Leca, Benedict; et al.: Rembrandt: Three Faces of the Master. (Cincinnati: Cincinnati Art Museum, 2008)
- Lecoq-Ramond, Sylvie; Paccoud, Stéphane; Schäfer, Dorit (eds.): Autoportraits: de Rembrandt au selfie [Projet réalisé en collaboration par la Staatliche Kunsthalle Karlsruhe, le Musée des Beaux-Arts de Lyon et les National Galleries of Scotland d'Èdimbourg]. (Cologne: Snoeck, 2015) [in French]
- Lecoq-Ramond, Sylvie; Paccoud, Stéphane; Schäfer, Dorit; Müller-Tamm, Pia; Clarke, Michael; Hall, James; et al. (eds.): Ich bin hier! Von Rembrandt zum Selfie [Kat. Staatliche Kunsthalle Karlsruhe, 2015–2016]. (Cologne: Snoeck, 2015) [in German]
- Liedtke, Walter; von Sonnenburg, Hubert; Logan, Carolyn; Orenstein, Nadine M.; Dickey, Stephanie S.: Rembrandt/Not Rembrandt in the Metropolitan Museum of Art: Aspects of Connoisseurship, 2 vols. (New York: Metropolitan Museum of Art, 1995)
- Lindemann, Bernd Wolfgang (ed.): Da Rembrandt a Vermeer. Valori civili nella pittura fiamminga e olandese del '600 / From Rembrandt to Vermeer. Civil values in 17th-century Flemish and Dutch painting. (Milan: Motta, 2008) [in Italian]
- McQueen, Alison; de Witt, David; Maciesza, Nathalie; Reynaerts, Jenny: Rembrandt in Parijs : Manet, Méryon, Degas en de herontdekking van de etskunst (1830–1890) [Rembrandt in Paris: Manet, Méryon, Degas and the Rediscovery of Etching (1830–1890)]. (Amsterdam: Uitgeverij JEA, 2018) [in Dutch]
- Middelkoop, Norbert; et al.: Rembrandt under the Scalpel: The Anatomy Lesson of Dr. Nicolaes Tulp Dissected [exh. cat.]. (The Hague: Mauritshuis, 1998)
- Minder, Nicole (ed.): Gravures de Dürer et Rembrandt: Collection Pierre Decker. (Vevey : Cabinet cantonal des estampes, Musée Jenisch, 1991) [in French]
- Minder, Nicole; et al. (eds.): Rembrandt: Les collections du Cabinet des estampes de Vevey. (Musée Jenisch Vevey, Cabinet cantonal des estampes, Fonds Pierre Decker, 1997) [in French]
- Müller, Jürgen; Mentzel, Jan-David; et al.: Rembrandt: von der Macht und Ohnmacht des Leibes: 100 Radierungen [Katalog zur Ausstellung des Augustinermuseums: Haus der Graphischen Sammlung, Augustinermuseum, Freiburg i. Br., 28. Oktober 2017 - 28. Januar 2018; Kunstsammlungen der Veste Coburg, 21. Juni 2018 - 9. September 2018]. (Freiburg: Städtische Museen Freiburg; Petersberg: Michael Imhof Verlag, 2017) [in German]
- Müller, Jürgen; Buck, Stephanie; et al.: Rembrandts Strich [Rembrandt's Mark]. (Dresden: Staatliche Kunstsammlungen & Paul Holberton Publishing, 2019)
- Occhipinti, Carlo: Maestri incisori europei, 1450–1750: dall'arte di Raffaello a Rembrandt e Goya. (Arona: Fondazione Art Museo, 2008) [in Italian]
- Ordovas, Pilar; et al. (eds.): Irrational Marks: Bacon and Rembrandt. (London: Ordovas, 2011)
- Ordovas, Pilar; et al. (eds.): Raw Truth: Auerbach—Rembrandt. (London: Ordovas, 2013)
- Paarlberg, Sander; Schoon, Peter; et al.: Greek Gods and Heroes in the Age of Rubens and Rembrandt. (Athens: National Gallery/Alexandros Soutzos Museum; Dordrecht: Dordrechts Museum, 2000)
- Robinson, William W.; et al.: Bruegel to Rembrandt: Dutch and Flemish Drawings from the Maida and George Abrams Collection [exh. cat.]. (Cambridge, MA: Harvard University Art Museums, 2002)
- Robinson, William W.; et al.: Drawings from the Age of Bruegel, Rubens, and Rembrandt: Highlights from the Collection of the Harvard Art Museums [exh. cat.]. (Cambridge, MA: Harvard University Art Museums; New Haven, CT: Yale University Press, 2016)
- Robinson, William W.: Rembrandt's “Indian Drawings” and His Later Work. (New York: Morgan Library & Museum, 2018)
- Runia, Epco; de Witt, David (eds.): Rembrandt's Social Network: Family, Friends and Acquaintances [exh. cat.]. (Zwolle: Uitgeverij WBooks, 2019) ISBN 9789462583252
- Rutgers, Jaco; Garnier-Pelle, Nicole: Rembrandt au musée Condé de Chantilly. (Dijon: Éditions Faton, 2018) [in French]
- Rutgers, Jaco; Standring, Timothy: Rembrandt: Painter as Printmaker [exh. cat.]. (New Haven, CT: Yale University Press, 2018)
- Schatborn, Peter; van Sloten, Leonore: Oude tekeningen, nieuwe namen. Rembrandt en zijn tijdgenoten [Old drawings, new names. Rembrandt and his contemporaries]. (Varik: Uitgeverij de Weideblik, 2014) ISBN 9789077767443 [in Dutch]
- Schrader, Stephanie; et al. (eds.): Rembrandt and the Inspiration of India. (Los Angeles, CA: J. Paul Getty Museum, 2018) ISBN 978-1-60606-552-5
- Schulze, Sabine (ed.). Leselust: Niederländische Malerei von Rembrandt bis Vermeer. (Stuttgart: Gerd Hatje, für die Schirn Kunsthalle Frankfurt, 1993) [in German]
- Schwartz, Gary (ed.): Sordid and Sacred: The Beggars in Rembrandt's Etchings. Selections from the John Villarino Collection [exh. cat.]. (Los Angeles: Landau Traveling Exhibitions, 2006)
- Schwartz, Gary (ed.): Emotions: Pain and Pleasure in Dutch Painting of the Golden Age [exh. cat. Frans Hals Museum, Haarlem, 11 October – 15 February 2015]. (Rotterdam: naiO10 Publishers, 2014)
- Sciolla, Gianni Carlo: Da Leonardo a Rembrandt: Disegni della Biblioteca Reale di Torino / From Leonardo to Rembrandt: Drawings of the Royal Library of Turin. (Turin: Umberto Allemandi 1989) [in Italian]
- Seifert, Christian Tico; Dickey, Stephanie S.; et al.: Rembrandt: Britain's Discovery of the Master. (Edinburgh: National Galleries of Scotland, 2018) ISBN 9781911054191
- Sigal-Klagsbald, Laurence; du Bourg, Alexis Merle: Rembrandt et la Nouvelle Jérusalem. Juifs et Chrétiens à Amsterdam au Siècle D'Or. [Cat. exh. Musée d'Art et d'Histoire du Judaïsme, Paris, 28 March – 1 July 2007]. (Paris: Éditions du Panama, 2007) ISBN 978-2-7557-0243-9 [in French]
- Stampfle, Felice; et al. (eds.): Rembrandt: Experimental Etcher [exh. cat.]. (Boston: Museum of Fine Arts; New York: The Pierpont Morgan Library, 1969)
- Starcky, Emmanuel: Rembrandt et son école, dessins du Musée du Louvre. (Paris: Musée du Louvre, 1988–89) [in French]
- Starcky, Emmanuel: Rembrandt et son école. Collections du musée de l'Ermitage de Saint- Pétersbourg [exh. cat.]. (Paris : Réunion des Musées Nationaux, 2003) [in French]
- Stefes, Annemarie; van Sloten, Leonore; van Oosterzee, Leonoor: Tekenen in Rembrandts tijd: Meesterwerken uit de Hamburger Kunsthalle / Drawing in Rembrandt's Day: Masterpieces from the Hamburger Kunsthalle. (Amsterdam: Museum Het Rembrandthuis, 2012) [in Dutch]
- Sutton, Peter C.; Robinson, William W.: Drawings by Rembrandt, His Students, and Circle from the Maida and George Abrams Collection [exh. cat.]. (Greenwich, CT: Bruce Museum of Arts and Science; New Haven, CT: Yale University Press, 2011)
- The Bridgestone Painting Research Group: In Darkness and Light, A Rembrandt in Tokyo Reconsidered. (Tokyo: Bridgestone Museum of Art, Ishibashi Foundation, 1989)
- Tümpel, Christian; Tümpel, Astrid: The Pre-Rembrandtists [exh. cat.]. (Sacramento, CA: E. B. Crocker Art Gallery, 1974)
- Tümpel, Astrid; Schatborn, Peter; et al.: Pieter Lastman, Leermeester van Rembrandt / Pieter Lastman, The Man Who Taught Rembrandt. (Amsterdam: Museum Het Rembrandthuis, 1991)
- Tummers, Anna; et al.: Frans Hals: Eye to Eye with Rembrandt, Rubens, and Titian [exh. cat.]. (Haarlem: Frans Hals Museum; Rotterdam: NAI010 Publishers, 2013)
- Turner, Jane Shoaf; et al.: Rembrandt's World: Dutch Drawings from the Clement C. Moore Collection. (New York: Morgan Library & Museum, 2012) ISBN 9780875981611
- Van Berge-Gerbaud, Mària: Rembrandt et son école. Dessins de la collection Frits Lugt. (Paris: Fondation Custodia, 1997) [in French]
- Van den Boogert, B.; et al.: Rembrandts schatkamer. (Amsterdam: Museum Het Rembrandthuis, 1999) [in Dutch]
- Van den Boogert, B.; et al.: Goethe en Rembrandt. Tekeningen uit Weimar. Uit de grafische bestanden van de Kunstsammlungen zu Weimar, aangevuld met werken uit het Goethe-Nationalmuseum. (Amsterdam: Amsterdam University Press, 1999) [in Dutch]
- Van der Coelen, Peter; Tümpel, Christian; et al.: Patriarchs, Angels and Prophets: The Old Testament in Netherlandish Printmaking from Lucas van Leyden to Rembrandt [exh. cat.]. (Amsterdam: Museum Het Rembrandthuis, 1996)
- Vergara, Alejandro; Posada Kubissa, Teresa; Westermann, Mariët: Rembrandt, pintor de historias. (Madrid: Museo Nacional del Prado & Ediciones El Viso, 2008) ISBN 978-84-8480-161-0 [in Spanish]
- Vignau-Wilberg, Thea: Rembrandt auf Papier. Werk und Wirkung [Rembrandt and his Followers. Drawings from Munich]. Mit einem Beitrag von Peter Schatborn. Katalog zur Ausstellung der Staatlichen Graphischen Sammlung München; München Alte Pinakothek, 5 December 2001 – 10 February 2002; Amsterdam Museum het Rembrandt. (München: Hirmer, 2001) ISBN 978-3-7774-9150-9 [in German]
- Waiboer, Adriaan E.: Northern Nocturnes: Nightscapes in the Age of Rembrandt. With an essay by Michiel Franken. [cat. exh.]. (Dublin: National Gallery of Ireland, 2005) ISBN 1-904288-13-8
- Weber, Gregor J.M.: Rembrandt im Kontrast. Die Blendung Simsons und Der Segen Jakobs. (München: Hirmer; Kassel: Staatliche Museen Kassel, 2005) [in German]
- Weber, Gregor J.M; Hartog Jager, Hans den; Nooteboom, Cees (eds.): Rembrandt-Velázquez: Nederlandse en Spaanse meesters / Rembrandt and Velázquez: Dutch and Spanish Masters. (Rotterdam: Nai010, 2019)
- Weislogel, Andrew C.; Banta, Andaleeb Badiee: Lines of Inquiry: Learning from Rembrandt's Etchings. (Ithaca, New York: Herbert F. Johnson Museum of Art, Cornell University, 2017)
- Weller, Dennis P.; Keyes, George S.; Rassieur, Tom; Seydl, Jon L.: Rembrandt in America: Collecting and Connoisseurship. (New York, NY : Skira Rizzoli Publications, 2011) ISBN 978-0847836857
- Westheider, Ortrud; Helfenstein, Joseph; Brinkmann, Bodo; Philipp, Michael (eds.): Rembrandts Orient. Westöstliche Begegnung in der niederländischen Kunst des 17. Jahrhunderts. (München: Verlag, 2020) [in German]
- Westheider, Ortrud; Helfenstein, Joseph; Brinkmann, Bodo; Philipp, Michael (eds.): Rembrandt's Orient: West Meets East in Dutch Art of the 17th Century. (Munich: Prestel, 2020)
- Wheelock, Arthur K. Jr.; et al.: Rembrandt's Late Religious Portraits. (Washington, DC: National Gallery of Art; Chicago: University of Chicago Press, 2005)
- Wheelock, Arthur K. Jr.: Jan Lievens: A Dutch Master Rediscovered [exhib. cat.]. (NewHaven, CT: Yale University Press, 2008) ISBN 978-0-300-14213-6
- Wheelock, Arthur K. Jr.; Luijten, Ger; Schatborn, Peter: Drawings for Paintings in the Age of Rembrandt. (Washington: National Gallery of Art; Paris: Fondation Custodia, 2016)
- Williams, Julia Lloyd: Rembrandt. Artemisa y Mujer en el lecho. (Madrid: Museo Nacional del Prado, 2002) ISBN 84-8480-025-3 [in Spanish]
- Woollett, Anne T.: Rembrandt in Southern California. (Los Angeles, CA: J. Paul Getty Museum, 2009)
- Zuffi, Stefano: Lo specchio infranto. Rembrandt: il racconto degli ultimi anni. (Milan: Longanesi, 2006) [in Italian]

==== Others ====
- Abbing, Michiel Roscam: Rembrant toont sijn konst. Bijdragen over Rembrandt-documenten uit de periode 1648–1756. (Leiden: Primavera Pers, 1999) [in Dutch]
- Abbing, Michiel Roscam (ed.): Rembrandt 2006: Essays. (Leiden: Foleor Publishers, 2006)
- Abbing, Michiel Roscam: Rembrandt's Elephant: The Story of Hansken. (Amsterdam: Leporello Uitgevers, 2006) ISBN 978-90-808745-6-5
- Abbing, Michiel Roscam: Rembrandt - Vie et oeuvre d'un génie. 20 documents d'époque reproduits en fac-similés. (Gennevilliers: Éditions Prisma, 2016) [in French]
- Ackley, Clifford S.; Baer, Ronni; Rassieur, Thomas E.: Rembrandt's Journey: Painter, Draftsman, Etcher. (Boston: Museum of Fine Arts, 2003)
- Adams, Ann Jensen (ed.): Rembrandt's Bathsheba Reading King David's Letter. (New York: Cambridge University Press, 1998)
- Ainsworth, M.W.; et al.: Art and Autoradiography: Insights into the Genesis of Paintings by Rembrandt, Van Dyck, and Vermeer. (New York: The Metropolitan Museum of Art, 1987)
- Alarcón, Diego: Rembrandt: Retrato de un pintor de Leyden. (Murcia: Editora Regional de Murcia, 2005) [in Spanish]
- Alexander-Knotter, Mirjam; Hillegars, Jasper; van Voolen, Edward. De 'joodse' Rembrandt. De mythe ontrafeld. (Zwolle: Waanders, 2007) [in Dutch]
- Alexander-Knotter, Mirjam; Hillegars, Jasper; van Voolen, Edward. The 'Jewish' Rembrandt: The myth unravelled. (Zwolle: Waanders Publishers, Amsterdam: Jewish Historical Museum, "This publication is based upon the Dutch-language catalogue that accompanied the eponymous exhibition at the Jewish Historical Museum in Amsterdam from 10 November 2006 until 4 February 2007.")
- Albers, Eckbert: Erkenntnismomente und Erkenntnisprozesse bei Rembrandt [Studien zur Kunstgeschichte, 174]. (Hildesheim: Georg Olms Verlag, 2008) ISBN 978-3-487-13831-2 [in German]
- Alpers, Svetlana: Rembrandt's Enterprise: The Studio and the Market. (Chicago: University of Chicago Press, 1988) ISBN 978-0-226-01518-7
- Alpers, Svetlana: L'Atelier de Rembrandt. La liberté, la peinture et l'argent. Traduit de l'anglais par Jean-François Sené. (Paris: Gallimard, 1991) [in French]
- Amel, Pascal: Rembrandt, l'humanité. (Paris: Éditions du Regard, 2016) [in French]
- Amore, Anthony; Mashberg, Tom: Stealing Rembrandts: The Untold Stories of Notorious art heists. (New York: Palgrave Macmillan, 2012) ISBN 9780230108530
- Aricò, Nicola: Rembrandt e il Duca. Lettura estetica del teatro marittimo di Messina. (Messina: GBM, 2007) [in Italian]
- Aronson, Alex: Shakespeare and Rembrandt: Metaphorical Representations in Poetry and the Visual Arts. (Essen: Verlag Die Blaue Eule, 1987)
- Arpino, Giovanni; Lecaldano, Paolo: L'opera pittorica completa di Rembrandt [Classici dell'Arte, 33]. (Milan: Rizzoli, 1969) [in Italian]
- Atwood, Nan T.: Rembrandt van Rijn's Jewish Bride Depicting Female Power in the Dutch Republic Through the Notion of Nation Building. (M.A. thesis, Brigham Young University, 2012)
- Bab, Julius: Rembrandt und Spinoza. Ein Doppelbildnis im deutsch-jüdischen Raum. (Berlin: Philo-Verlag, 1934) [in German]
- Bailey, Anthony: Rembrandt's House: Exploring the World of the Great Master. (Boston: Houghton Mifflin, 1978)
- Bailey, Anthony: Responses to Rembrandt: Who Painted the Polish Rider?, a Controversy Considered. (New York: Timken Publishers, 1994)
- Bakker, Boudewijn; et al.: Landscapes of Rembrandt: His Favourite Walks. (Amsterdam: Gemeentearchie, 1988)
- Bakker, Boudewijn: Landschap en Wereldbeeld: Van Van Eyck tot Rembrandt. (Bussum: Uitgeverij Thoth, 2004) [in Dutch]
- Bakker, Boudewijn: Landscape and Religion: From Van Eyck to Rembrandt. Translated from the Dutch by Diane Webb. (Burlington, VT: Ashgate, 2012)
- Balet, Leo: Rembrandt and Spinoza. (New York: Philosophical Library, 1962)
- Barker, Mary Christine: A Disquieting Presence: The Virgin Mary in Rembrandt's 'Protestant' Art. (Ph.D. diss., University of Auckland, 2010)
- Bartsch, Adam von: Catalogue raisonné de toutes les estampes qui forment l'œuvre de Rembrandt et ceux de ses principaux imitateurs [2 vols.]. (Vienne: Chez A. Blumauer) [in French]
- Bauch, Kurt: Die Kunst des Jungen Rembrandt. (Heidelberg: Winter, 1933) [in German]
- Bauch, Kurt: Der frühe Rembrandt und seine Zeit. Studien zur geschichtlichen Bedeutung seines Frühstils. (Berlin: Verlag Gebr. Mann, 1960) [in German]
- Bauch, Kurt: Rembrandt Gemälde. (Berlin: W. de Gruyter, 1966) [in German]
- Baudiquey, Paul: Un Évangile selon Rembrandt. (Paris: Éditions Mame, 1989) [in French]
- Baudiquey, Paul: Rembrandt, le retour du Prodigue. (Paris: Éditions Mame, 1995) [in French]
- Baudiquey, Paul: Rembrandt, L'évangile intérieur. (Paris: Éditions Mame, 2014) [in French]
- Bal, Mieke: Het Rembrandt effect: Visies op kijken. (Utrecht: HES Uitgevers, 1987) [in Dutch]
- Bal, Mieke: Verf en verderf. Lezen in Rembrandt. (Amsterdam: Prometheus, 1990) ISBN 9053330089 [in Dutch]
- Bal, Mieke: Reading Rembrandt: Beyond the Word-Image Opposition. (Amsterdam: Amsterdam University Press, 1991)
- Becker, Willy: Rembrandt als Dichter. Eine Untersuchung über das Poetische in den biblischen Darstellungen Rembrandts. (Leipzig: Klinkhardt & Biermann, 1909) [in German]
- Beliën, Herman; Knevel, Paul: Langs Rembrandts roem. De reputatie van een meester. (Amsterdam: Salomé, 2006) ISBN 9053568360 [in Dutch]
- Benesch, Otto: Rembrandt: Werk und Forschung. (Vienna, 1935) [in German]
- Benesch, Otto: The Drawings of Rembrandt: First Complete Edition in Six Volumes. (London: Phaidon, 1954–57)
- Benesch, Otto: Rembrandt as a Draughtsman: An Essay with 115 Illustrations. (London: Phaidon Press, 1960)
- Benesch, Otto: The Drawings of Rembrandt. A Critical and Chronological Catalogue [2nd ed., 6 vols.]. (London: Phaidon, 1973)
- Berger Jr., Harry: Fictions of the Pose: Rembrandt Against the Italian Renaissance. (Stanford, California: Stanford University Press, 2000) ISBN 978-0804733243
- Berger Jr., Harry: Manhood, Marriage, and Mischief: Rembrandt's "Night Watch" and Other Dutch Group Portraits. (New York: Fordham University Press, 2007) ISBN 978-0-8232-2557-6
- Berger Jr., Harry: The Perils of Uglytown: Studies in Structural Misanthropology from Plato to Rembrandt. (New York: Fordham University Press, 2015)
- Berrong, Richard M.: Putting Monet and Rembrandt into Words: Pierre Loti's Recreation and Theorization of Claude Monet's Impressionism and Rembrandt's Landscapes in Literature. (Chapel Hill, NC: University of North Carolina Press, 2014) ISBN 978-1-4696-1365-9
- Bertrand, Robert: "Les pèlerins d'Emmaüs" de Rembrandt selon l'esthétique théologique de Balthasar: grille d'analyse picturale artistique et théologique. (Thèse de doctorat, Université Laval, 2008) [in French]
- Bevers, Holm; et al.: Drawings by Rembrandt and His Pupils: Telling the Difference. (Los Angeles, CA: The J. Paul Getty Museum, 2009)
- Bevers, Holm; Kelch, Jan; Lindemann, Bernd Wolfgang; Seifert, Christian Tico (eds.): Rembrandt – Wissenschaft auf der Suche. Beiträge des Internationalen Symposiums Berlin, 4.-5. November 2006 [Jahrbuch der Berliner Museen. Neue Folge. Vol. 51, Beiheft]. (Berlin: Gebr. Mann Verlag, 2009) ISBN 978-3-7861-2563-1 [in German]
- Białostocki, Jan; Michałkowa, Janina (eds.): Rembrandt w oczach współczesnych. (Warsaw: Państwowy Instytut Wydawniczy, 1957) [in Polish]
- Bikker, Jonathan: Willem Drost (1633–1659): A Rembrandt Pupil in Amsterdam and Venice. (New Haven: Yale University Press, 2005)
- Bikker, Jonathan: Marten en Oopjen. Twee monumentale portretten van Rembrandt. (Amsterdam: Rijksmuseum, 2016) ISBN 9789491714825 [in Dutch]
- Biörklund, George; Barnard, Osbert H.: Rembrandt's Etchings: True and False [revised edition]. (Stockholm: Biörklund, 1968)
- Binstock, Benjamin: Becoming Rembrandt: National, Religious, and Sexual Identity in Rembrandt's History Paintings. (Ph.D. diss., Columbia University, 1997)
- Blanc, Charles: L'Œuvre de Rembrandt, reproduit en planches photographiques. (Paris: Gide et J. Bandry, 1853) [in French]
- Blanc, Charles: L'œuvre complet de Rembrandt: Catalogue raisonné de toutes les eaux-fortes du maître et de ses peintures... orné de bois gravés et de quarante eaux-fortes tirées à part et rapportées dans le texte. (Paris: Gide, 1859–1861) [in French]
- Blaazer, Ferry: Het naakte lichaam in de etsen van Rembrandt. (Deventer: Scriptio, 2009) ISBN 9789087730154 [in Dutch]
- Blanc, Jan: Dans l'atelier de Rembrandt: Le maître et ses élèves. (Paris: Éditions de La Martinière, 2006) ISBN 9782732434315 [in French]
- Bockemühl, Michael: Rembrandt: Zum Wandel des Bildes und seiner Anschauung im Spätwerk. (Mittenwald: Mäander Verlag, 1981) [in German]
- Bockemühl, Michael: Rembrandt, 1606–1669. Das Rätsel der Erscheinung. (Cologne: Benedikt Taschen Verlag, 1991) [in German]
- Bockemühl, Michael: Rembrandt, 1606–1669: The Mystery of the Revealed Form. Translated from the German by Michael Claridge. (Cologne: Taschen, 2004)
- Bode, Wilhelm von; de Groot, Cornelis Hofstede: The Complete Work of Rembrandt: History, Description and Heliographic Reproduction of All the Master's Pictures, with a Study of His Life and Art. [8 vols.]. (Paris: Charles Sedelmeyer, 1897–1906)
- Bode, Wilhelm von: Rembrandt und seine Zeitgenossen: Charakterbilder der grossen Meister der holländischen und vlämischen Malerschule im siebzehnten Jahrhundert. (Leipzig: E. A. Seemann Verlag, 1907) [in German]
- Bodenbach, Hans Joachim: Rembrandt - Selbstporträts von fremder Hand. (Dresden: Verlag der Kunst, 2003) [in German]
- Böhm, Günter: Los judíos en la obra de Rembrandt. (Santiago de Chile: Universidad de Chile, Facultad de Filosofía y Letras, Centro de Estudios de Cultura Judaica, 1974) [in Spanish]
- Bohlmann, Carolin; Fink, Thomas; Weiss, Philipp (eds.): Lichtgefüge des 17. Jahrhunderts. Rembrandt und Vermeer – Spinoza und Leibniz. (München: Wilhelm Fink 2008) ISBN 978-3-7705-4454-7 [in German]
- Boka, Georges; Courteau, Bernard: Rembrandt's Nightwatch: The Mystery Revealed. (Quebec, Canada: C.C.E.P., 1994) ISBN 2-920217-41-0
- Bonafoux, Pascal: Rembrandt: Self-Portrait. (New York: Rizzoli, 1985)
- Bonafoux, Pascal: Rembrandt, le clair, l'obscur, collection "Découvertes Gallimard" (nº 76). (Paris: Gallimard, 1990) [in French]
- Bonafoux, Pascal: Rembrandt: Master of the Portrait, "Abrams Discoveries" series. (New York: Harry N. Abrams, 1992)
- Bonafoux, Pascal: Rembrandt: Substance and Shadow, 'New Horizons' series. (London: Thames and Hudson, 1992)
- Bonafoux, Pascal: Rembrandt: Die Selbstbildnisse. Aus dem Französischen von Matthias Wolf. (München: Schirmer/Mosel Verlag, 2019) [in German]
- Boomgaard, Jeroen: De verloren zoon. Rembrandt en de Nederlandse kunstgeschiedschrijving. (Amsterdam: Babylon-De Geus, 1995) [in Dutch]
- Boon, K.G.: Rembrandt: The Complete Etchings. (New York: Harry N. Abrams, 1963)
- Borenius, Tancred: Rembrandt: Selected Paintings. (London: Phaidon Press, 1942)
- Bosman, Machiel: Rembrandts val. Een geschiedenis van misvattingen en alternatieve feiten. (Amsterdam: Athenaeum, 2019) ISBN 9789025309558 [in Dutch]
- Bracken, William Worth: Rembrandt in the 1630s: Dialogues and Competitive Environment. (Ph.D. thesis, Institute of Fine Arts, New York University, 2011)
- Bredius, Abraham: The Paintings of Rembrandt. (London: Phaidon, 1937)
- Bredius, Abraham: Rembrandt: The Complete Edition of the Paintings, 3rd ed. [Revised by Horst Gerson]. (London: Phaidon Press, 1969)
- Bredt, E. W.: Rembrandt-Bibel: Vier Bände mit 270 Abbildungen. (München: Hugo Schmidt Verlag, 1921) [in German]
- Bredt, E. W.: Die Rembrandt-Bibel: Altes und Neues Testament: Mit 246 Abbildungen und 34 Gravüren. (München: Hugo Schmidt Verlag, 1922) [in German]
- Bredt, E. W.: Die Rembrandt-Bibel: Altes und Neues Testament [3rd ed., 2 vols.]. (München: Hugo Schmidt Verlag, 1926) [in German]
- Bringmann, Michael (ed.): Von Rembrandt bis Menzel. Meisterwerke der Zeichenkunst; die Sammlung Brandes. (Konstanz: Städtische Wessenberg-Galerie; Heidelberg: Ed. Braus im Wachter Verlag 2000) [in German]
- Broos, B.P.J.: Rembrandt studies. (Ph.D. diss., Universiteit Utrecht, 1977) [in Dutch]
- Broos, B.P.J.: Index to the Formal Sources of Rembrandt's Art. (Maarssen, Netherlands: Gary Schwartz, 1977)
- Broos, B.P.J.: Het Rembrandt boek. (Zwolle: Waanders, 2006) ISBN 9040091110 [in Dutch]
- Broos, B.P.J.: Saskia, de vrouw van Rembrandt. (Zwolle: Wbooks, 2012) [in Dutch]
- Broos, Ton; Dierick, A.P. (eds.): About and Around Rembrandt: Special Issue of the Canadian Journal of Netherlandic Studies in Commemoration of the 400th Birthday of Rembrandt Harmensz. van Rijn [Canadian Journal of Netherlandic Studies/Revue canadienne d'études néerlandaises, Volume XXVIII]. (Windsor, Ontario: CAANS-ACAEN, 2007)
- Brown, Christopher; Kelch, Jan; van Thiel, Pieter (eds.): Rembrandt: The Master and His Workshop. (New Haven: Yale University Press, 1991)
- Bruchmann, Alexandra: Zwischen Emulation und Dekonstruktion. Rezeption der diskursiven Künstlerfigur Rembrandt in der Kunst der zweiten Hälfte des 20. Jahrhunderts. (Ph.D. thesis, University of Cologne, 2012) [in German]
- Bruin, Kees: De echte Rembrandt. Verering van een genie in de twintigste eeuw. (Amsterdam: Balans, 1995) [in Dutch]
- Bruyn, J.; et al.: A Corpus of Rembrandt Paintings [Volume I, Stichting Foundation Rembrandt Research Project]. (The Hague/Dordrecht/Boston: Martinus Nijhoff, 1982)
- Bruyn, J.; et al.: A Corpus of Rembrandt Paintings [Volume II, Stichting Foundation Rembrandt Research Project]. (Dordrecht/Boston: Martinus Nijhoff, 1982)
- Brückner, Christel: Rembrandts Braunschweiger “Familienbild”: Seine thematische Figuren- und Farbkomposition und die Kunst Italiens. (Hildesheim: Olms, 1997) ISBN 3-487-10244-7 [in German]
- Buechli, Esther: Points de vue, points de fuite: la perspective dans l'atelier de Rembrandt. (Ph.D. diss., Université de Lausanne, 2009) [in French]
- Bugnion-Secretan, P.: Méditation avec Pascal et Rembrandt: de la douleur à la consolation. Pensées choisies et présentées par P. Bugnion-Secretan. Avec 8 illustrations tirées de l'oeuvre de Rembrandt. (Neuchâtel: Ed. de La Baconnière, 1949) [in French]
- Burckhardt, Jacob: Rembrandt und Van Dyck. Zwei Vorträge. (Bern: Alfred Scherz, 1947) [in German]
- Butor, Michel: Dialogue avec Rembrandt van Rijn sur Samson et Dalila. (Paris: Absteme et Bobance Éditions, 2005) ISBN 2-914490-13-5 [in French]
- Buvelot, Quentin; White, Christopher (eds.): Rembrandt by Himself. (London: National Gallery Publications Limited, 1999)
- Campbell, C.G.: Studies in the Formal Sources of Rembrandt's Figure Compositions. (PhD dissertation, University of London, 1971)
- Carroll, Margaret D.: Rembrandt's Nightwatch and the Iconological Traditions of Militia Company Portraiture in Amsterdam. (Ph.D. diss., Harvard University, 1976)
- Carstensen, Hans Thomas: Empirie als Bildsprache. Überlegungen zum jüdischen Einfluss auf Rembrandts Kunst [Wissenschaftliche Beiträge aus europäischen Hochschulen]. (Ammersbek bei Hamburg: Verlag an der Lottbek, 1993) [in German]
- Carter-Kneff, Bethany Ann: A Discussion: Rembrandt's Influence on the Evolution of the Printmaking Process through his Experimental Attitude towards the Medium. (M.A. thesis, East Tennessee State University, 2004)
- Cavalli-Björkman, Görel (ed.): Rembrandt and His Pupils: Papers Given at a Symposium in Nationalmuseum Stockholm, 2–3 October 1992. (Stockholm: Nationalmuseum, 1993)
- Chalard-Fillaudeau, Anne: Rembrandt dans l'histoire de l'art, la littérature et la philosophie européennes depuis 1669. (Thèse soutenue à l'Ecole Pratique des Hautes Etudes, Paris, 2002) [in French]
- Chalard-Fillaudeau, Anne: Rembrandt, l'artiste au fil des textes: Rembrandt dans la littérature et la philosophie européennes depuis 1669. (Paris: L'Harmattan, 2004) [in French]
- Chalard-Fillaudeau, Anne: Rembrandt ou le génie du dépassement. Essai sur l'artiste hollandais dans l'histoire de l'art allemande. (Saarbrücken: Editions Universitaires Européennes, 2010) [in French]
- Chambaz, Bernard: Ecce homo: ou l'énigme Rembrandt. (Paris: Desclée de Brouwer Éditions, 2006) ISBN 2-220-05703-8 [in French]
- Chapman, H. Perry: The Image of the Artist: Roles and Guises in Rembrandt's Self-Portraits. (Ph.D. diss., Princeton University, 1983)
- Chapman, H. Perry: Rembrandt's Self-Portraits: A Study Seventeenth-Century Identity. (Princeton, N.J.: Princeton University Press, 1990)
- Charrier, Claire: Du sublime dans l'œuvre gravé de Rembrandt. (Thèse de doctorat en Esthétique et science de l'art, Université Paris Ouest Nanterre La Défense, 2016) [in French]
- Chong, Alan (ed.): Rembrandt Creates Rembrandt: Art and Ambition in Leiden, 1629–1631. [Essays by Arthur K. Wheelock Jr., Mariët Westermann, Christopher White and Alan Chong]. (Boston: Isabella Stewart Gardner Museum; Zwolle: Wanders Publishers, 2000) ISBN 90-400-9468-3
- Chung, Jina: Rembrandt Redefined: Making the “Global Artist” in Seventeenth-Century Amsterdam. (M.A. thesis, University of Texas at Austin, 2011)
- Cixous, Hélène: Poetas en pintura. Escritos sobre arte: de Rembrandt a Nancy Spero. (Castellón de la Plana: Ellago Ediciones, 2011) ISBN 9788492965137 [in Spanish]
- Clark, Kenneth: Rembrandt and the Italian Renaissance. (London: John Murray, 1966)
- Clark, Kenneth: An Introduction to Rembrandt. (London: John Murray/Readers Union, 1978)
- Claussin, Ignace Joseph de: Catalogue raisonné de toutes les estampes qui forment l'œuvre de Rembrandt, et des principales pièces de ses élèves; composé par les sieurs Gersaint, Helle, Glomy et P. Yver [Nouvelle édition corrigée et consi-dérablement augmentée]. (Paris, 1824) [in French]
- Connor, Alexandra: Rembrandt's Monkey: And Other Tales from the Secret Lives of the Great Artists. (New York: St. Martin's Press, 1991)
- Crenshaw, Paul: Rembrandt's Bankruptcy. (Ph.D. thesis, Institute of Fine Arts, New York University, 2000)
- Crenshaw, Paul: Rembrandt's Bankruptcy: The Artist, his Patrons, and the Art market in Seventeenth-Century Netherlands. (Cambridge and New York: Cambridge University Press, 2006) ISBN 978-0521858250
- Czichos, Horst: Was ist falsch am falschen Rembrandt? und Wie hart ist Damaszener Stahl? – Wie man mit Technik Kunst erforscht, prüft und erhält. (Berlin: Nicolaische Verlagsbuchhandlun, 2002) [in German]
- Czichos, Horst; Hahn, Oliver: Was ist falsch am falschen Rembrandt? Mit High-Tech den Rätseln der Kunstgeschichte auf der Spur. (München: Carl Hanser Verlag, 2011) [in German]
- Coquerel, Athanase: Rembrandt et l'individualisme dans l'art. (Paris: Sandoz et Fischbacher, 1868) [in French]
- De Groot, Cornelis Hofstede: Die Urkunden über Rembrandt (1575–1721). (The Hague: Martinus Nijhoff, 1906) [in German]
- Dandrieu, Laurent: Les peintres de l'invisible: Le Greco, Rembrandt, Vermeer et autres messagers de l'infini. (Paris: Editions du Cerf, 2016) [in French]
- De Groot, Cornelis Hofstede: Die holländische Kritik der jetzigen Rembrandt-Forschung und neuest wiedergefundene Rembrandtbilder. (Stuttgart: Deutsche Verlags-Anstalt, 1922) [in German]
- Dagen, Philippe: L'influence de Rembrandt sur la peinture contemporaine en France de la fin du XIXe siècle à nos jours. (Ph.D. diss., Université Paris-Sorbonne, 1982) [in French]
- De Vries, A. B.; Froentjes, W.; Tóth-Ubbens, Magdi: Rembrandt in the Mauritshuis: An Interdisciplinary Study. Translated from the Dutch by James Brockway. (Alphen aan den Rijn: Sijthoff & Noordhoff, 1978)
- De Wilt, Koos: Rembrandt Inc.: Marktstrategieën van een genie. (Amsterdam: Nieuw Amsterdam, 2006) ISBN 978-90-468-0184-0 [in Dutch]
- De Winkel, Marieke; Manuth, Volker: Rembrandt's Minerva in Her Study of 1635: The Splendor and Wisdom of a Goddess. (New York: Otto Naumann, 2002)
- De Winkel, Marieke: Fashion and Fancy: Dress and Meaning in Rembrandt's Paintings. (Amsterdam: Amsterdam University Press, 2006) ISBN 90-5356-917-0
- De Winkel, Marieke; Manuth, Volker: Rembrandt: The Self-Portraits. (London: Taschen, 2019) ISBN 3836577003
- De Winkel, Marieke; Manuth, Volker; van Leeuwen, Rudie: Rembrandt: The Complete Paintings. (London: Taschen, 2019) ISBN 3836526328
- Debluë, François: Conversation avec Rembrandt. (Paris: Éditions Seghers, 2006) [in French]
- Debrunner, Hugo: Rembrandts frühes Schaffen. (Zürich: Diss.-Druckerei A.-G. Gebr. Leemann &. Co., 1929) [in German]
- Dekiert, Marcus: Rembrandt: Die Opferung Isaaks. (Munich: Alte Pinakothek, 2004) [in German]
- Dessons, Gérard: L'odeur de la peinture, essai sur une question posée par Rembrandt à la peinture représentative. (Paris: L'Aphélie, 1987) [in French]
- Dessons, Gérard: Rembrandt, l'odeur de la peinture; à partir d'une question posée à la peinture représentative. (Paris: Éditions Laurence Teper, 2006) [in French]
- Dessons, Gérard: L'odeur de la peinture. L'hypothese Rembrandt. (Paris: Manucius, 2013) [in French]
- Dhomps, Claude: Le Diamant de Rembrandt: ou l'incroyable puissance du symbole. (Nice: Bénévent, 2004) [in French]
- Dickey, Stephanie S.: Rembrandt Harmensz van Rijn: The Illustrated Bartsch, Vol. 50 [Supplement]. (New York: Abaris Books, 1993)
- Dickey, Stephanie S.: Prints, Portraits and Patronage in Rembrandt's Work around 1640. (Ph.D. diss., New York University, 1994)
- Dickey, Stephanie S.: Rembrandt: Portraits in Print. (Amsterdam/Philadelphia: John Benjamins, 2004)
- Dickey, Stephanie S.: Rembrandt Face to Face. (Indianapolis, IN: Indianapolis Museum of Art, 2006)
- Dickey, Stephanie S.; Wilson, John: Rembrandt's Recession: Passion and Prints in the Dutch Golden Age. (San Diego: Timken Museum of Art, 2010)
- Dickey, Stephanie S.: Rembrandt and His Circle: Insights and Discoveries. (Amsterdam: Amsterdam University Press, 2017)
- Dickey, Stephanie S.; Sander, Jochen (eds.): Rembrandt in Amsterdam: Creativity and Competition. (New Haven, CT: Yale University Press, 2021)
- Díaz-Plaja, Guillermo: Rembrandt y la sinagoga española. (Barcelona: Plaza & Janés, 1982) [in Spanish]
- Driessen, Christoph: Rembrandt und die Frauen. (Regensburg: Verlag Friedrich Pustet, 2011) ISBN 978-3-7917-2359-4 [in German]
- Driessen, Christoph: Rembrandts vrouwen. (Amsterdam: Bert Bakker, 2012) ISBN 9789035136908 [in Dutch]
- Drost, Willi: Adam Elsheimer als Zeichner. Goudts Nachahmungen und Elsheimers Weiterleben bei Rembrandt. Ein Beitrag zur Strukturforschung. (Stuttgart: Kohlhammer, 1957) [in German]
- Dumesnil, Alfred: La Foi nouvelle cherchée dans l'art de Rembrandt à Beethoven. (Paris: E. Thunot et Cie., 1850) [in French]
- Durham, John: The Biblical Rembrandt: Human Painter in a Landscape of Faith. (Macon, GA.: Mercer University Press, 2004) ISBN 978-0865548862
- Dutuit, Eugène: L'oeuvre complet de Rembrandt [2 vols.]. (Paris: A. Lévy, 1883) [in French]
- Dutuit, Eugène: Tableaux et dessins de Rembrandt: Catalogue historique et descriptif; supplément à l'Oeuvre complet de Rembrandt. (Paris: A. Lévy, 1885) [in French]
- Egorova, K.S.: Portret v tvorcestve Rembrandta. (Moskva: Iskoesstvo, 1975) [in Russian]
- Eisler, Max: Rembrandt als Landschaftler. (Munich, 1918) [in German]
- Eisler, Max: Der Alte Rembrandt. (Vienna: Druck und Verlag der Österreichischen Staatsdruckerei, 1927) [in German]
- Emmens, J.A.: Rembrandt en de regels van de kunst [Rembrandt and the Rules of Art]. (Utrecht: Haentjens Dekker & Gumbert, 1968) [in Dutch]
- Erftemeijer, A.: De aap van Rembrandt. Kunstenaarsanekdotes van de klassieke oudheid tot heden. (Haarlem: Becht, 2000) [in Dutch]
- Erpel, Fritz: Die Selbstbildnisse Rembrandts. (Berlin: Henschelverlag, 1967) [in German]
- Fendrich, Herbert: Rembrandts Darstellungen des Emmausmahles [Bochumer Schriften zur Kunstgeschichte, 13]. (Frankfurt am Main: Peter Lang, 1990) [in German]
- Fernández, Carmen Cámara: Rembrandt, genio del claroscuro. (Madrid: Editorial Libsa, S.A., 2008) ISBN 9788466218566 [in Spanish]
- Foucart, Jacques: Les Peintures de Rembrandt au Louvre. (Paris: Éditions de la RMN, 1982) [in French]
- Fraenger, Wilhelm: Der junge Rembrandt: Johann Georg van Vliet und Rembrandt. (Heidelberg: C. Winter, 1920) [in German]
- Frederick, Amy Reed: Rembrandt's Etched Sketches and Seventeenth-Century Print Culture. (Ph.D. thesis, Case Western Reserve University, 2014)
- Freedberg, David; Monkhouse, Wendy: Visions of the Self: Rembrandt and Now. (New York: Rizzoli, 2020)
- Fuchs, R.H.: Rembrandt en Amsterdam. (Rotterdam: Lemniscaat, 1968) [in Dutch]
- Fuchs, R.H.; van de Waal, H.: Steps Towards Rembrandt: Collected Articles, 1937–1972. (Amsterdam: North-Holland Publishing, 1974)
- Fuchs, R.H.: Rembrandt spreekt. Een verslag. (Amsterdam: De Bezige Bij, 2006) [in Dutch]
- Gantner, Joseph: Rembrandt und die Verwandlung Klassischer Formen. (Bern/Munich: Francke Verlag, 1964) [in German]
- Gatenbröcker, Silke: Familienglück – Rembrandt und sein Braunschweiger Meisterwerk. (Petersberg: Imhof, 2006) ISBN 3-86568-187-5 [in German]
- Genet, Jean: Le Secret de Rembrandt [Œuvres complètes]. (Paris: Gallimard, 1968) ISBN 2070102157 [in French]
- Genet, Jean: Ce quiest resté d'un Rembrandt déchiré en petits carrés bien réguliers, et foutu aux chiottes [Œuvres complètes]. (Paris: Gallimard, 1968) [in French]
  - "What Remains of a Rembrandt Torn into Four Equal Pieces and Flushed Down the Toilet"
- Genet, Jean: Rembrandt: Ein Fragment. Aus dem Französischen übersetzt von Katharina E. Meyer und Marc Bastet. (Gifkendorf, Vastorf: Merlin Verlag, 1996) [in German]
- Genet, Jean: Rembrandt. (Paris: Gallimard, 2016) [in French]
- Genevaz, Patrick: Sur trois gravures de Rembrandt. (Paris: La Délirante, 2008) [in French]
- Gersaint, Edme-François: Catalogue raisonné de toutes les pièces qui forment l'oeuvre de Rembrandt. (Paris: Chez Hochereau, 1751) [in French]
- Gerson, Horst (ed.): Seven Letters by Rembrandt. Transcribed by Isabella van Eeghen, translated by Yda Ovink. (The Hague: L.J. C. Boucher, 1961)
- Gerson, Horst: De Schilderijen van Rembrandt. (Amsterdam: Meulenhoff, 1968) [in Dutch]
- Gerson, Horst: Rembrandt Paintings. (Amsterdam: Meulenhoff International, 1968)
- Gilboa, Anat: Images of the Feminine in Rembrandt's Work. (Delft: Eburon Publishers, 2003) ISBN 90-5166-954-2
- Giltaij, Jeroen: Ruffo en Rembrandt. Over een Siciliaanse verzamelaar in de zeventiende eeuw die drie schilderijen bij Rembrandt bestelde. (Zutphen: Walburg Pers, 1999) [in Dutch]
- Girnius, Rima Marija: Rembrandt's Spaces. (Ph.D. diss., Bryn Mawr College, 2007)
- Gnann, Achim: Landschaftszeichnungen / Landscape Drawings. (Petersberg: Michael Imhof Verlag, 2021) [in German]
- Golahny, Amy: Rembrandt's Paintings and the Venetian Tradition. (Ph.D. diss., Columbia University, 1984)
- Golahny, Amy: Rembrandt's Reading: The Artist's Bookshelf of Ancient Poetry and History. (Amsterdam: Amsterdam University Press, 2003) ISBN 90-5356-609-0
- Golahny, Amy: Rembrandt: Studies in his Varied Approaches to Italian Art. (Leiden: Brill, 2020)
- Goldschneider, Ludwig: Rembrandt: Gemälde und Graphik. Mit den drei frühesten Biographien von Sandrart, Baldinucci & Houbraken und einem Katalog und Anmerkungen. (Kön: Phaidon, 1960) [in German]
- Gollwitzer, Gerhard; Gollwitzer, Helmut: Rembrandt van Rijn. Hundertguldenblatt: Die grosse Krankenheilung. (Stuttgart: Evangelisches Verlagswerk, 1969) [in German]
- Gottwald, Franziska: Das Tronie. Muster—Studie—Meisterwerk: Die Genese einer Gattung der Malerei vom 15. Jahrhundert bis zu Rembrandt [Kunstwissenschaftliche Studien, Band 164]. (Berlin: Deutscher Kunstverlag, 2011) [in German]
- Graul, Richard: Fünfzig Zeichnungen von Rembrandt. (Leipzig: E. A. Seemann, 1906) [in German]
- Graul, Richard: Rembrandt Handzeichnungen. (Leipzig: Insel, 1934) [in German]
- Graul, Richard: Rembrandt: Gemälde, Handzeichnungen, Radierungen. (Leipzig: Johannes Asmus Verlag, 1941) [in German]
- Grimm, Claus: Rembrandt selbst. Eine Neubewertung seiner Porträtkunst. (Stuttgart: Belser Verlag, 1991) [in German]
- Grohé, Stefan: Rembrandts mythologische Historien. (Cologne/Weimar/Vienna: Böhlau Verlag, 1996) [in German]
- Guérin, Michel: La peinture effarée. Rembrandt et l'autoportrait. (Chatou: Éditions de la Transparence, 2011) [in French]
- Guérin, Michel: Origine de la peinture. Sur Rembrandt, Cézanne et l'immémorial. (Paris: Les Belles Lettres, 2013) [in French]
- Guillaud, Jacqueline; Guillaud, Maurice; Lambert, Gisèle: Rembrandt. La figuration humaine. (Paris/New York: Guillaud / Clarkson N. Potter, 1986) [in French]
- Guillaud, Jacqueline; Guillaud, Maurice: Rembrandt. The Human Form and Spirit. [Translated from the French by Suzanne Boorsch et al.]. (New York: Clarkson N. Potter, 1986)
- Gutbrod, Helga: Lievens und Rembrandt: Studien zum Verhältnis ihrer Kunst. (Frankfurt am Main: Peter Lang, 1996) [in German]
- Gyllenhaal, Martha: Rembrandt's Artful Use of Statues and Casts: New Insights into His Studio Practices and Working Methods. (Ph.D. diss., Temple University, 2008)
- Haden, Francis Seymour: The Etched Work of Rembrandt Critically Reconsidered. (London: Metchim, 1877)
- Hadjinicolaou, Yannis: Denkende Körper – Formende Hände: Handeling in Kunst und Kunsttheorie der Rembrandtisten. (Ph.D. diss., Freie Universität Berlin, 2014) [in German]
- Hadjinicolaou, Yannis: Denkende Körper – Formende Hände: Handeling in Kunst und Kunsttheorie der “Rembrandtisten” [Actus et Imago, Berliner Schriften für Bildaktforschung und Verkörperungsphilosophie, XVIII]. (Berlin: Walter de Gruyter, 2016) ISBN 978-3-11-043885-7 [in German]
- Hadjinicolaou, Yannis: Thinking Bodies – Shaping Hands: Handeling in Art and Theory of the Late Rembrandtists. Translated from the German by Christina Oberstebrink and Jennifer Kilian. [Studies in Netherlandish Art and Cultural History; Vol. 15]. (Leiden/Boston: Brill, 2019) ISBN 978-90-04-40772-5
- Haeger, Barbara Joan: The Religious Significance of Rembrandt's Return of the Prodigal Son: An Examination of the Picture in the Context of the Visual and Iconographic Tradition. (Ph.D. diss., University of Michigan, 1983)
- Halewood, William H.: Six Subjects of Reformation Art: A Preface to Rembrandt. (Toronto: University of Toronto Press, 1982)
- Hamann, Richard: Rembrandts Radierungen. (Berlin: Verlag von Bruno Cassirer, 1906) [in German]
- Hamerton, P.G.: The Etchings of Rembrandt. (London: Seeley & Co., 1896)
- Harvey, Christl Marcia: Form and Content in Rembrandt's Early “Raising of Lazarus” Theme. (M.A. thesis, University of British Columbia, 1980)
- Haussherr, Reiner: Rembrandts Jacobssegen. Überlegung zur Deutung des Gemäldes in der Kasseler Galerie. (Opladen: Westdeutscher Verlag, 1976) [in German]
- Haverkamp-Begemann, Egbert: Rembrandt's The Nightwatch. (Princeton, NJ: Princeton University Press, 1982)
- Hausler, Bettina: Das Phänomen Rembrandtismus in der europäischen Druckgraphik des 17. und 18. Jahrhunderts. (Ph.D. diss., Ludwig-Maximilians-Universität München, 2002) [in German]
- Häslein, Christiane: Am Anfang war das Wort. Das Ende der “stommen schilderkonst” am Beispiel Rembrandts. (Weimar: VDG, Verlag und Datenbank für Geisteswissenschaften, 2004) ISBN 3-89739-427-8 [in German]
- Hecht, Peter: Van Gogh en Rembrandt. (Amsterdam: Van Gogh Museum, 2006) [in Dutch]
- Heckscher, William S.: Rembrandt's Anatomy of Dr. Nicolaas Tulp: An Iconological Study. (New York: New York University Press, 1959)
- Hedinger, Bärbel; Diers, Michael; Müller, Jürgen (eds.): Max Liebermann. Die Kunstsammlung. Von Rembrandt bis Manet. (München: Hirmer, 2013) ISBN 978-3-7774-2173-5 [in German]
- Heel, S. A. C. Dudok Van: De jonge Rembrandt onder tijdgenoten. Godsdienst en schilderkunst in Leiden en Amsterdam. (Nijmegen: Nijmegen University Press, 2006) [in Dutch]
- Heenk, Liesbeth: Rembrandt and his Influence on Eighteenth-century German and Austrian Printmakers. (Amsterdam: Museum het Rembrandthuis - Rembrandt Information Centre, 1998)
- Heiland, Susanne; Lüdecke, Heinz (eds.): Rembrandt und die Nachwelt. (Leipzig: E.A. Seemann, 1960) [in German]
- Held, Julius S.: Rembrandt and the Book of Tobit. (Northampton, MA: The Gehenna Press, 1964)
- Held, Julius S.: Rembrandt's Aristotle and Other Rembrandt Studies. (Princeton, N.J.: Princeton University Press, 1969)
- Held, Julius S.: Rembrandt-Studien. (Leipzig: E. A. Seemann Verlag, 1983) [in German]
- Held, Julius S.: Rembrandt Studies, revised and expanded edition. (Princeton, N.J.: Princeton University Press, 1991)
- Hell, Hans: Die späten Handzeichnungen Rembrandts. (Berlin: De Gruyter, 1930) [in German]
- Hellerstedt, Kahren Jones: Hurdy-Gurdies from Hieronymus Bosch to Rembrandt. (Ph.D. diss., University of Pittsburgh, 1981)
- Hellmold, Martin: Rembrandts Einsamkeit. Diskursanalytische Studien zur Konzeption des Künstlersubjekts in der Moderne. (Ph.D. diss., Ruhr-Universität Bochum, 2001) [in German]
- Hetzer, Theodor: Rubens und Rembrandt. Edited by Gertrude Berthold. (Stuttgart: Urachhaus, 1984) [in German]
- Hind, Arthur M.: A Catalogue of Rembrandt's Etchings [2nd ed.]. (London: Methuen & Co., 1923)
- Hind, Arthur M.: Rembrandt: Being the Substance of the Charles Eliot Norton Lectures Delivered before Harvard University, 1930–1931. (Cambridge, MA: Harvard University Press, 1932)
- Hinterding, Erik: The Fortunes of Rembrandt's Copper Plates. (Amsterdam: Museum Het Rembrandthuis, 1993)
- Hinterding, Erik: Rembrandt als etser. Twee studies naar de praktijk van productie en verspreiding. (Ph.D. diss., Universiteit Utrecht, 2001) [in Dutch]
- Hinterding, Erik: Rembrandt as an Etcher: The Practice of Production and Distribution. (Ouderkerk aan den IJssel, Netherlands: Sound and Vision Publishers, 2006)
- Hinterding, Erik; Schatborn, Peter: Rembrandt: The Complete Drawings and Etchings. (London: Taschen, 2019) ISBN 9783836575447
- Hoekstra, H.: Rembrandt and the Bible: Stories from the Old and Mew Testament, Illustrated by Rembrandt in Paintings, Etchings and Drawings. Translated from the Dutch by Tony Langham and Plym Peters. (Utrecht: Magna Books, 1990)
- Hoekveld Meijer, Gerda: De god van Rembrandt: Rembrandt als commentator van de godsdienst van zijn tijd. (Zoetermeer: Meinema, 2005) ISBN 9789021140599 [in Dutch]
- Hoff, Ursula: Rembrandt und England. (Hamburg: Kleinert, 1935) [in German]
- Hogan, Joan Mary: The Iconography of Rembrandt's Depictions of the Holy Family (in a Domestic Setting). (M.A. thesis, Queen's University, 2008)
- Housden, Roger: How Rembrandt Reveals Your Beautiful Imperfect Self. (New York: Harmony Books, 2005)
- Hulsker, Jan: Wie was Rembrandt?. (Den Haag: Daamen, 1957) [in Dutch]
- Ilschner, Liselotte: Rembrandt als Erzieher und seine Bedeutung. Studie über die kulturelle Struktur der neunziger Jahre. (Danzig, 1928) [in German]
- Imbert, Hugues: Rembrandt et Richard Wagner: Le clair-obscur dans l'art. (Paris: Fischbacher, 1897) [in French]
- Jeutter, Ewald: Zur Problematik der Rembrandt-Rezeption im Werk des Genuesen Giovanni Benedetto Castiglione (Genua 1609–1664 Mantua). Eine Untersuchung zu seinem Stil und seinen Nachwirkungen im 17. und 18. Jahrhundert. (Weimar: VDG, 2004) ISBN 978-3-89739-466-7 [in German]
- Kalman, Maira and Salomon, Xavier F. Rembrandt's Polish Rider. (The Frick Collection, 2019)
- Keith, Roberts: Rembrandt: Master Drawings. (Oxford: Phaidon Press, 1976)
- Kelch, Jan; von Simson, Otto (eds.): Neue Beiträge zur Rembrandt-Forschung. (Berlin: Gebr. Mann, 1973) [in German]
- Keller, Ina Maria: Studien zu den deutschen Rembrandtnachahmungen des 18. Jahrhunderts. (Ph.D. diss., Ludwig-Maximilians-Universität München, 1971; Berlin, 1981) [in German]
- Kemp, Wolfgang: Rembrandt, Die Heilige Familie oder die Kunst, einen Vorhang zu lüften. (Frankfurt am Main: Fischer Taschenbuch Verlag, 1986) [in German]
- Kettering, Alison McNeil: Rembrandt's Group Portraits. (Zwolle: Waanders, 2006)
- Knips, Ignaz: Grenzen und Idiome. Rembrandts Selbstportrait datiert zwischen 1663 und 1665. (Cologne: Salon, 1998) [in German]
- Knox, Giles: Sense Knowledge and the Challenge of Italian Renaissance Art: El Greco, Velázquez, Rembrandt. (Amsterdam: Amsterdam University Press, 2019)
- Knubben, Thomas: Von Schongauer zu Rembrandt. Meisterwerke der Druckgraphik aus der Sammlung der Fürsten zu Waldburg-Wolfegg. (Ostfildern: Hatje Cantz Verlag, 1996) [in German]
- Kock, Erich: Dein Kleid ist Licht. Rembrandt malt den Glauben. (Limburg: Lahn-Verlag, 1977) ISBN 3-7840-2627-3 [in German]
- Kofuku, Akira (ed.): Rembrandt and the Rembrandt School: The Bible, Mythology and Ancient History. [Text in Japanese with summaries in English]. (Tokyo : NHK Promotions, 2003) [in Japanese]
- Kofuku, Akira (ed.): Rembrandt and Dutch History Painting in the 17th Century. Conference Proceedings of 13–14 September 2003. (Tokyo: The National Museum of Western Art, 2004, 180pp)
- Kölbl, Alois: Das Leben der Form. Georg Simmels kunstphilosophischer Versuch über Rembrandt. (Vienna/Cologne/Weimar: Böhlau, 1998) [in German]
- Kolloff, Eduard: Rembrandt's Leben und Werke [Historisches Taschenbuch 5]. (Leipzig: Friedrich von Raumer, 1854). Reprinted, Christian Tümpel (ed.): Rembrandt's Leben und Werke, nach neuen Actenstücken und Gesichtspunkten geschildert. Deutsches Bibel-Archiv. Abhandlungen und Vorträge 4. (Hamburg: F. Wittig, 1971) [in German]
- Kosack, Wolfgang: Ein zweiter Rembrandt: "Die Staalmeesters". Kunsthistorische Studie. (Basel: Verlag Christoph Brunner, 2015) [in German]
- Kreutzer, Maria: Rembrandt und die Bibel: Radierungen, Zeichnungen, Kommentare. (Stuttgart: Reclam Verlag, 2003) ISBN 9783150105399 [in German]
- Kruse, J.; Neumann, Carl (ed.): Die Zeichnungen Rembrandts und seiner Schule im National-Museum zu Stockholm. (Den Haag: Martinus Nijhoff, 1920) [in German]
- Kurby, Gordon: Rembrandt's Comet. (Star Swim L.L.C., 2018) ISBN 978-0999528655
- Ladwein, Michael: Mensch Rembrandt. (Stuttgart: Verlag Urachhaus, 2019) ISBN 978-3-8251-5192-8 [in German]
- Landsberger, Franz: Rembrandt, the Jews and the Bible. Translated from the German by Felix N. Gerson. (Philadelphia: The Jewish Publication Society of America, 1946)
- Langbehn, Julius: Rembrandt als Erzieher [Rembrandt as Teacher/Rembrandt as Educator]. (Leipzig: C.L. Hirschfeld, 1890) [in German]
- Larsen, Erik: Rembrandt, peintre de paysages. Une vision nouvelle. (Louvain-la-Neuve: Institut supérieur d'archéologie et d'histoire de l'art, 1983) [in French]
- Laurie, Arthur Pillans: A Study of Rembrandt and the Paintings of His School by Means of Magnified Photographs. (London: E. Walker, 1930)
- Laurentius, Th.: Etchings by Rembrandt. Reflections of the Golden Age. An Investigation into the Paper used by Rembrandt. (Amsterdam: Van Rossum & Co.; Zwolle: Waanders Publishers, 1996)
- Laurie, Arthur Pillans: The Brushwork of Rembrandt and His School. (London: Oxford University Press, 1932)
- Lautner, Max: Wer ist Rembrandt? Grundlagen zu einem Neubau der holländischen Kunstgeschichte. (Breslau, 1891) [in German]
- Lautner, Max: Rembrandt, ein historisches Problem. (Berlin: H. Walther, 1910) [in German]
- Lavin, Irving; Lavin, Marilyn Aronberg: Liturgia d'amore. Immagini del Cantico dei Cantici nell'arte di Cimabue, Michelangelo e Rembrandt. (Modena: Franco Cosimo Panini, 1999) [in Italian]
- Lavin, Irving; Lavin, Marilyn Aronberg: The Liturgy of Love: Images from the Song of Songs in the Art of Cimabue, Michelangelo, and Rembrandt. (The Franklin D. Murphy Lectures XIV, University of Kansas, 2001)
- Lavin, Irving; Lavin, Marilyn Aronberg: Rembrandt. La sposa ebrea [Traduttore: S. Battelli M. Borsari]. (Modena: Franco Cosimo Panini, 2005) [in Italian]
- Leber, Hermann Rudolf: Rembrandts Einfluß auf die deutsche Malerei des Barock und Rokoko. (Dissertation, Cologne, 1924) [in German]
- Lee, Choung-Hi: Rembrandts Landschaftsdarstellung. Ihre Entwicklung in den Radierungen und in ausgewählten Zeichnungen. Eine kompositionsanalytische Studie. (Frankfurt am Main, 1992) [in German]
- Leistra, J.; de Boer, M.: Bredius, Rembrandt en het Mauritshuis. Een eigenzinnige directeur verzamelt. (Zwolle: Waanders, 1991) [in Dutch]
- Levinson-Lessing, Vladimir Francevič; et al. (eds.): Rembrandt Harmensz van Rijn: Paintings from Soviet Museums. Translated by V. Pozner. (Leningrad: Aurora, 1970)
- Lobis, Victoria Sancho; Warren, Maureen: Van Dyck, Rembrandt, and the Portrait Print. (New Haven, CT: Yale University Press, 2016) ISBN 9780300218824
- Lobis, Victoria Sancho; Owen, Antoinette; Casadio, Francesca; Ziemba, Emily Vokt: Rubens, Rembrandt, and Drawing in the Golden Age. (New Haven, CT: Yale University Press, 2019)
- Ludwig, Emil: Rembrandts Schicksal. (Berlin: Ernst Rowohlt Verlag, 1923) [in German]
- Ludwig, Emil: Three Titans: Michael Angelo, Rembrandt, Beethoven. (London: G.P. Putnam's Sons, 1930; New York: Modern Age Books, Inc., 1938)
- Ludwig, Emil: Trois Titans: Michel-Ange, Rembrandt, Beethoven. [Trad. française par G. Bernard]. (Paris: Payot, 1930) [in French]
- Lugt, Frits: Rembrandt, ses élèves, ses imitateurs, ses copistes. (Paris: Musées Nationaux, Palais du Louvre, 1933) [in French]
- Mai, Ekkehard: Rembrandt: Selbstbildnis als Zeuxis. Der Kunstbrief. (Berlin: Gebr. Mann Verlag, 2002) ISBN 3-7861-2438-8 [in German]
- Mannering, Douglas: The Life and Works of Rembrandt van Rijn. (New York: Shooting Star Press, 1994)
- McNamara, Simon: Rembrandt's Passion Series. (Newcastle upon Tyne: Cambridge Scholars Publishing, 2015)
- McQueen, Alison: The Rise of the Cult of Rembrandt: Reinventing an Old Master in Nineteenth-Century France. (Amsterdam: Amsterdam University Press, 2003)
- Meijer, Bert W.: Rembrandt nel Seicento Toscano [Italia e i Paesi Bassi; No. 1]. (Florence: Centro Di, 1983) [in Italian]
- Meijer, E. R.: Rembrandt. (München: Wilhelm Goldmann Verlag, 1959) [in German]
- Meijer, Willem L.: Kleinood en aanstoot. De Honderdguldenprent en andere bijbelse historiën van Rembrandt. (Leiden: Groen, 1995) [in Dutch]
- Meldrum, David S.: Rembrandt's Painting, with an Essay on His Life and Work. (New York: Methuen & Co., 1923)
- Milner, Max: Rembrandt à Emmaüs. (Paris: José Corti, 2006) [in French]
- Mittendorf, Stefan-Maria: FarbeBekennen. Tizian - Rembrandt - Marées. Versuch über die Farbe an Münchner Werken zur Bestimmung ihres Stellenwertes in der Kunst Hans von Marées'. (Frankfurt am Main: Peter Lang, 1997) [in German]
- Molinié, Anne-Sophie: Rembrandt, d'ombre et de lumière. (Garches, Hauts-de-Seine: Éditions À propos, 2006) [in French]
- Molyneux, John: Rembrandt and Revolution. (London: Redwords, 2001) ISBN 9781872208152
- Molyneux, John: Rembrandt y revolución. Traducción de Gemma Galdon Clavell. (Barcelona: Ediciones de Intervención Cultural / El Viejo Topo, 2006) ISBN 9788495776891 [in Spanish]
- Mouron, Isabelle: Gerrit Dou vs Rembrandt: les enjeux de la touche dans la peinture hollandaise du XVIIe siècle. (Ph.D. diss., Université de Lausanne, 2010) [in French]
- Müller, Jürgen: Der sokratische Künstler: Studien zu Rembrandts Nachtwache. (Leiden: Brill, 2015) [in German]
- Muller, Marinus: Zo leefde Rembrandt in de Gouden Eeuw. (Baarn: Hollandia, 1968) [in Dutch]
- Münz, Ludwig: Die Kunst Rembrandts und Goethes Sehen. (Leipzig: Verlag Heinrich Keller, 1934) [in German]
- Münz, Ludwig: The Etchings of Rembrandt [Complete edition, 2 vols.]. (London: Phaidon Press, 1952)
- Nadler, Steven: Rembrandt's Jews. (Chicago: The University of Chicago Press, 2003) ISBN 0-226-56736-2
- Nadler, Steven: Gli ebrei di Rembrandt. Traduzione di Andrea Asioli. (Turin: Giulio Einaudi Editore, 2017) [in Italian]
- Nakamura, Toshiharu (eds.): Rembrandt as Norm and Anti-Norm. Papers Given at a Colloquium Held at the Graduate School of Letters, Kyoto University, 15 December 2002. (The Graduate School of Letters, Kyoto University, 2004)
- Nash, J. M.: The Age of Rembrandt and Vermeer: Dutch Painting in the Seventeenth Century. (Oxford: Phaidon Press, 1979)
- Neipp, Bernadette; Marguerat, Daniel: Rembrandt et la mort de Jésus: La tendresse d'un regard. (Saint-Maurice, Switzerland: Editions Saint-Augustin 2001) ISBN 9782880112349 [in French]
- Neumann, Carl: Aus Rembrandts Werkstatt. (Heidelberg: C. Winter, 1918) [in German]
- Nigg, Walter: Rembrandt, Maler des Ewigen. (Zürich: Diogenes Verlag, 2006) [in German]
- Nixon, Michelle Marie: Approaching a Sociology of Aesthetics: Searching for Method in Georg Simmel's Rembrandt. (M.Sc. thesis, Brigham Young University, 2012)
- Nouwen, Henri: The Return of the Prodigal Son: A Story of Homecoming. (New York: Doubleday Image Books, 1992)
- Nowell-Usticke, G.W.: Rembrandt's Etchings: States and Values. (Narberth, PA: Livingston Publishing Co., 1967)
- Ozaki, Akihiro: Rembrandt's Collection: Fashioning the Self. (Tokyo: Sangensha Publishing, 2004) ISBN 4-88303-135-7 [in Japanese]
- Paroutaud, Xavier: Lumière de Rembrandt, Parole du Christ: Enquête sur l'expression religieuse de l'œuvre de Rembrandt. (Doctorat en histoire de l'art, École pratique des hautes études, Paris, 2011) [in French]
- Pavans, Jean: Proust, Vermeer, Rembrandt. (Paris: Éditions Arléa, 2018) [in French]
- Perlove, Shelley; Baldwin, Robert: Impressions of Faith: Rembrandt's Biblical Etchings. (Dearborn: University of Michigan-Dearborn, Mardigian Library, 1989)
- Perlove, Shelley; Silver, Larry: Rembrandt's Faith: Church and Temple in the Dutch Golden Age. (University Park, PA: Pennsylvania State University Press, 2009) ISBN 978-0-271-03406-5
- Pinder, Wilhelm: Rembrandts Selbstbildnisse. (Leipzig: Karl Robert Langewiesche Verlag, 1943) [in German]
- Porkay, Martin: Das gegeisselte Rembrandt-Bild und andere kleine Studien über Irrtümer um Rembrandt. (Stuttgart: Selbstverlag, 1951) [in German]
- Porkay, Martin: Rembrandt, andere Leute und ich. (Wetzlar: Pegasus Verlag, 1959) [in German]
- Porkay, Martin: Der Drost-lose Rembrandt. (München: Münchner Buchgewerbehaus, 1961) [in German]
- Porkay, Martin: Die Abenteuer zweier unechter Rembrandts. (München: Lama Verlag, 1963) [in German]
- Portier-Theisz, Judith: Le premier autoportrait de Rembrandt (1628). Étude sur la formation du jeune Rembrandt. (Bern: Peter Lang, 1999) [in French]
- Preston, Frances Lawrence: Rembrandt's Paintings: The Development of an Oeuvre. (Ph.D. diss., Columbia University, 1991)
- Prigot, Aude: La réception de Rembrandt van Rhyn à travers les estampes en France au XVIIIe siècle. (Thèse de doctorat en Histoire de l'art; Ecole Doctorale Espaces, Cultures, Sociétés [Aix-en-Provence], 2011) [in French]
- Prigot, Aude: La réception de Rembrandt à travers les estampes en France au XVIIIe siècle. (Rennes: Presses universitaires de Rennes, 2018) [in French]
- Proust, Marcel: Chardin et Rembrandt. (Paris: Le Bruit du Temps, 2009) [in French]
- Proust, Marcel: Chardin and Rembrandt. Translated from the French by Jennie Feldman. (London: David Zwirner Books, 2016)
- Rachleff, Owen S.: Rembrandt's Life of Christ: Paintings, Drawings, and Etchings by Rembrandt, with Quotations from the Gospels. (New York: Abradale Press, 1966)
- Rad, Gerhard von: Das Opfer des Abraham. Mit Texten von Luther, Kierkegaard, Kolakowski und Bildern von Rembrandt. (München: Kaiser, 1971) [in German]
- Reiling, Netty (Anna Seghers): Jude und Judentum im Werke Rembrandts (PhD thesis, University of Heidelberg, 1924) [in German]
- Rentsch, Eugen: Der Humor bei Rembrandt. (Strassburg: Heitz & Mündel, 1909) [in German]
- Ricci, Corrado: Rembrandt in Italia. (Milan: Alfieri & Lacroix, 1918) [in Italian]
- Riemersma, Jan: Een glimp van de hemel. Het geheim van Rembrandts geloof. (Utrecht: Uitgeverij Kok, 2016) [in Dutch]
- Roberts, Jane: The World View of Rembrandt. (New York: New Awareness Network Inc., 2006) ISBN 0976897822
- Rohde, Shelley: Rembrandt, van A tot Z. (Bussum: THOTH, 2005) [in Dutch]
- Rosenberg, Adolf: Rembrandt: Des Meisters Gemälde in 565 Abbildungen. (Stuttgart/Leipzig: Deutsche Verlags-Anstalt, 1906) [in German]
- Rosenberg, Adolf: Rembrandt: Des Meisters Gemälde in 643 Abbildungen. (Stuttgart/Leipzig: Deutsche Verlags-Anstalt, 1908) [in German]
- Rosenberg, Charles M.: Rembrandt's Religious Prints: The Jack and Alfrieda Feddersen Collection of Rembrandt Etchings. (Bloomington, IN: Indiana University Press and Snite Museum of Art, 2017)
- Rosenberg, Jakob: Rembrandt [2 vols.]. (Cambridge, MA: Harvard University Press, 1948)
- Rosenberg, Jakob: Rembrandt: Life and Work [revised edition]. (Ithaca, NY: Cornell University Press, 1980)
- Rosenhauer-Song, HeaYean: Studien zur Komposition in ausgewählten Werken Rembrandts unter besonderer Berücksichtigung der Links-Rechts-Problematik. (Ph.D. diss., Georg-August-Universität Göttingen, 1999) [in German]
- Rotermund, Hans-Martin: Rembrandts Handzeichnungen und Radierungen zur Bibel. (Lahr: Verlag Ernst Kaufmann; Stuttgart: Württembergische Bibelanstalt, 1963) [in German]
- Rotermund, Hans-Martin: Rembrandt's Drawings and Etchings for the Bible. Translated from the German by Shierry M. Weber. (Philadelphia: Pilgrim Press, 1969)
- Royalton-Kisch, Martin: Drawings by Rembrandt and His Circle in the British Museum. (London: British Museum Press, 1992)
- Royalton-Kisch, Martin; Hinterding, E.; Luijten, G.: Rembrandt the Printmaker. (British Museum Press, 2000)
- Rønberg, Lene Bøgh; Pedersen, Eve de la Fuente: Rembrandt? The Master and His Workshop. (København: Statens Museum for Kunst, 2006) ISBN 978-87-90096-51-9
- Ruiz-Domènec, José Enrique: Cautivos de la fama: Rembrandt, Mozart, Freud. (Barcelona: Ediciones Península, 2006) [in Spanish]
- Rulkens, Charlotte: Rembrandt en het Mauritshuis. (Zwolle: Waanders Uitgevers, 2019) [in Dutch]
- Rulkens, Charlotte: Rembrandt and the Mauritshuis. (Zwolle: Waanders Uitgevers, 2019)
- Rutgers, Jaco; Rembrandt in Italië. Receptie en verzamelgeschiedenis [Rembrandt in Italy. Reception and History of Collecting]. (PhD diss., Utrecht University, 2008) [in Dutch]
- Rutgers, Jaco; Rijnders, Mieke (eds.): Rembrandt in perspectief. De veranderende visie op de meester en zijn werk. (Zwolle: Open Universiteit/Waanders Uitgevers, 2014) [in Dutch]
- Samis, Peter Seth: The Appropriation of Rembrandt by the Nineteenth-Century French Etchers. (Master's thesis, University of California, Berkeley, 1988)
- Scallen, Catherine B.: Rembrandt and Saint Jerome. (Ph.D. diss., Princeton University, 1990)
- Scallen, Catherine B.: Rembrandt, Reputation, and the Practice of Connoisseurship. (Amsterdam: Amsterdam University Press, 2004)
- Schatborn, Peter: Drawings by Rembrandt, His Anonymous Pupils and Followers. Translated from the Dutch by Wulfert and Patricia Wardle. (Amsterdam: Rijksmuseum; The Hague: Staatsuitgerverij, 1985)
- Schatborn, Peter: Rembrandt and His Circle: Drawings in the Frits Lugt Collection [2 vols.]. (Bussum: Thoth; Paris: Fondation Custodia, 2010)
- Scheidig, Walther: Rembrandt als Zeichner. (Leipzig: VEB E.A. Seemann Verlag, 1962) [in German]
- Scheltema, Pieter: Rembrand: Redevoering over het leven en de verdiensten van Rembrand van Rijn, met eene menigte geschiedkundige bijlagen meerendeels uit echte bronnen geput. (Amsterdam: P.N. van Kampen, 1853) [in Dutch]
- Schitomirsky, Moses: Das Raumproblem bei Rembrandt. (Bern: Buchdruckerei Ott & Bolliger, 1912) [in German]
- Schmidt-Degener, F.: Rembrandt und der holländische Barock. (Leipzig: B.G. Teubner, 1928) [in German]
- Schneider, Cynthia P.; et al. (eds.): Rembrandt's Landscapes: Drawings and Prints. (Washington, D.C.: National Gallery of Art, 1990)
- Scholl, Verena: Rembrandts biblische Frauenporträts. Eine Begegnung von Theologie und Malerei. (Zürich: Theologischer Verlag Zürich, 2006) ISBN 978-3-290-17384-5 [in German]
- Schwartz, Gary (ed.): Rembrandt: All the Etchings Reproduced in True Size. (Maarssen: Schwartz, 1977)
- Schwartz, Gary: Rembrandt, His Life, His Paintings. (New York: Viking Press, 1985)
- Schwartz, Gary (ed.): The Complete Etchings of Rembrandt: Reproduced in Original Size. (New York: Dover Publications, 1994)
- Schwartz, Gary: The Night Watch. (Zwolle: Waanders, 2002)
- Silver, Larry: Rembrandt and the Divine [Studies in Iconology, 11]. (Leuven: Peeters Publishers, 2018) ISBN 978-90-429-3568-6
- Schama, Simon: Rembrandt's Eyes. (London: Allen Lane, 1999)
- Schama, Simon: Rembrandts Augen. Aus dem Englischen von Bettina Blumenberg. (Berlin: Siedler Verlag, 2000) [in German]
- Schama, Simon: De ogen van Rembrandt. (Amsterdam: Atlas Contact, 2019) ISBN 9789045038483 [in Dutch]
- Schapelhouman, Marijn: Rembrandt en de kunst van het tekenen. (Zwolle: Waanders, 2006) [in Dutch]
- Schapelhouman, Marijn: Rembrandt and the Art of Drawing. (Amsterdam: Rijksmuseum; Zwolle: Waanders Publishers, 2006)
- Schinnerer, Adolf: Rembrandt Zeichnungen. (München: R. Piper & Co. Verlag., 1944) [in German]
- Schnackenburg, Bernhard: Jan Lievens: Freund und Rivale des jungen Rembrandt. (Petersberg: Michael Imhof Verlag, 2016) [in German]
- Schot, Wim; et al.: Rembrandts schildermaterialen: Over linnen, loodwit en lijnzaadolie [Rembrandt's painting materials: On linen, lead white and linseed oil]. (Amsterdam: Museum Het Rembrandthuis, 2011) ISBN 9789080781702 [in Dutch]
- Schupbach, William: The Paradox of Rembrandt's Anatomy of Dr. Tulp [Medical History, Supplement No. 2]. (London: Wellcome Institute for the History of Medicine, 1982)
- Scott, Susan (ed.): Rembrandt, Rubens, and the Art of Their Time: Recent Perspectives. (University Park, PA: Pennsylvania State University Press, 1997)
- Seghers, Anna (Reiling Radványi, Netty): Jude und Judentum im Werke Rembrandts. (Ph.D. diss., Universität Heidelberg, 1924; Leipzig: Reclam, 1981) [in German]
- Seghers, Anna (Reiling Radványi, Netty): L'ebreo e l'ebraismo nell'opera di Rembrandt. Traduzione di Paola Buscaglione Candela. A cura di Vincenzo Pinto. (Florence: Giuntina, 2008) [in Italian]
- Seidlitz, Woldemar von: Kritische Verzeichnis der Radierungen Rembrandts. (Leipzig: Verlag von E.A. Seemann, 1895) [in German]
- Seidlitz, Woldemar von: Die Radierungen Rembrandts. Mit einem kritischen Verzeichnis und Abbildung sämtlicher Radierungen. (Leipzig: E. A. Seemann, 1922) [in German]
- Seifert, Christian Tico: Rembrandt & Britain. (Edinburgh: Trustees of the National Galleries of Scotland, 2018)
- Sell, Stacey Lynn: Rembrandt's Draftsmanship and the Traditions of Renaissance Art. (Ph.D. diss., University of Virginia, 1993)
- Senzoku, Nobuyuki; et al.: Renburanto, Kyoshō to sono shūhen [Rembrandt and the Bible]. (Tokyo: Art Life, 1986) [in Japanese]
- Servaes, Franz: Rembrandt im Rahmen seiner Zeit. (Vienna/Leipzig: Karl König, 1926) [in German]
- Sevcik, Anja K. (ed.): Inside Rembrandt, 1606–1669. (Petersberg: Michael Imhof Verlag 2019)
- Simmel, Georg: Rembrandt: Ein kunstphilodophischer Versuch. (Leipzig: K. Wolff Verlag, 1916) [in German]
- Simmel, Georg: Rembrandt: Un saggio di filosofia dell'arte. Traduzione di Gianfranco Gabetta. (Milan: Abscondita, 2001) [in Italian]
- Simmel, Georg: Rembrandt: An Essay in the Philosophy of Art. Translated and edited by Alan Scott and Helmut Staubmann. (New York: Routledge, 2005)
- Singer, Hans W.: Rembrandt: Des Meisters Radierungen in 402 Abbildungen. (Stuttgart/Leipzig: Deutsche Verlags-Anstalt, 1906) [in German]
- Slatkes, Leonard J.: Rembrandt and Persia. (New York: Abaris Books, 1983)
- Slive, Seymour: Rembrandt and his Critics, 1630–1730. (The Hague: Martinus Nijhoff, 1953)
- Slive, Seymour: Rembrandt Drawings. (Los Angeles, CA: J. Paul Getty Museum, 2009)
- Slive, Seymour: The Drawings of Rembrandt: A New Study. (London: Thames & Hudson, 2009)
- Silve, Seymour: The Drawings of Rembrandt. (London: Thames & Hudson, 2019)
- Sluijter, Eric Jan: Rembrandt and the Female Nude. (Amsterdam: Amsterdam University Press, 2006) ISBN 978-90-5356-876-7
- Sluijter, Eric Jan: Rembrandt's Rivals: History painting in Amsterdam, 1630–1650 [Oculi: Studies in the Arts of the Low Countries, vol. 14]. (Amsterdam/Philadelphia: John Benjamins Publishing, 2015)
- Small, Andrew: Essays in Self-Portraiture: A Comparison of Technique in the Self-Portraits of Montaigne and Rembrandt. (New York: Peter Lang, 1996)
- Smith, Baige Elise: Rembrandt's Anatomy Lessons. (Ph.D. diss., University of Western Australia, 2010)
- Smith, Samantha L.: Painting Blindness and Obscuring Vision: Rembrandt and the Senses. (Master's Thesis in Art History, University of Bergen, 2014)
- Soesman, Albert: Rembrandt – Spuren des Genius: Heilende Kräfte der Bildkomposition. (Stuttgart: Urachhaus, 2006) [in German]
- Spijkerboer, A.M.: Rembrandts engel. Bijbelverhalen van een schilder. (Meppel: Skandalon-Bruna, 2006) [in Dutch]
- Squarzina, Silvia Danesi: Giovinezza di Rembrandt. La committenza mennonita. (Rome: De Luca Editori d'Arte, 2013) ISBN 8865571373 [in Italian]
- Stam, Deirdre C.: Rembrandt After Three Hundred Years: A Symposium. (Chicago: Art Institute of Chicago, 1973)
- Starcky, Emmanuel: Rembrandt: Les figures. (Paris: Flammarion, 1999) [in French]
- Steele, Gordon Edward: Rembrandt's Homer in the Mauritshuis. (M.A. thesis, University of British Columbia, 1973)
- Straten, Roelof Van Rembrandts Leidse tijd, 1606–1632. (Leiden: Foleor Publishers, 2005) ISBN 9075035217 [in Dutch]
- Straten, Roelof Van: Young Rembrandt: The Leiden Years, 1606–1632. Translated from the Dutch by R. Quartero, with contributions by Ingrid Moerman. (Leiden: Foleor Publishers, 2005) ISBN 90-75035-22-5
- Straten, Roelof Van; Moerman, Ingrid W.L.: Rembrandts Weg zur Kunst 1606–1632. (Berlin: Dietrich Reimer Verlag, 2006) ISBN 9783496013433 [in German]
- Strauss, Walter; Meulen, Marjon van der (eds.): The Rembrandt Documents. (New York: Abaris Books, 1979)
- Streiff, Bruno: Le Peintre et le Philosophe ou Rembrandt et Spinoza à Amsterdam. (Paris: Éditions Complicités, 2002) ISBN 978-2910721343 [in French]
- Strzygowski, Josef: Das Werden des Barock bei Raphael und Correggio, nebst einem Anhang über Rembrandt. (Strassburg: Heitz & Mündel, 1898) [in German]
- Stückelberger, Johannes: Rembrandt und die Moderne. Der Dialog mit Rembrandt in der deutschen Kunst um 1900. (Munich: Wilhelm Fink Verlag, 1996) [in German]
- Sumowski, Werner: Drawings of the Rembrandt School [10 vols.]. Edited and translated by Walter L. Strauss. (New York: Abaris Books, 1979–1992)
- Sumowski, Werner: Gemälde der Rembrandt-Schüler in vier Bänden [6 vols.]. (Landau in der Pfalz: Edition PVA, 1983) [in German]
- Suthor, Nicola: Rembrandts Rauheit. Eine phänomenologische Untersuchung. (Paderborn: Wilhelm Fink Verlag, 2014) [in German]
- Suthor, Nicola: Rembrandt's Roughness. (Princeton: Princeton University Press, 2018) ISBN 9780691172446
- 'T Hooft, W. A. Visser: Rembrandt and the Gospel. (London: SCM Press, 1957)
- Taylor, Michael: Rembrandt's Nose: Of Flesh and Spirit in the Master's Portraits. (New York: Distributed Art Publishers, 2007)
- Theilhaber, Felix A.: Dein Reich komme! Ein chiliastischer Roman aus der Zeit Rembrandts und Spinozas. (Berlin: C.A. Schwetschke & Sohn, 1924) [in German]
- Thompson, Thomas S.: The Maturing of Rembrandt (1630–1662): Four Stages of Expressive Development in the Depiction of the Female Nude in Drawings and Etchings. (M.A. thesis, University of Cincinnati, 2014)
- Todorov, Tzvetan: L'art ou la vie! Le cas Rembrandt. Suivi d'Art et morale. (Paris: Biro Éditeur, 2008) [in French]
- Todorov, Tzvetan: ¡El arte o la vida! El caso Rembrandt. Arte y moral. Traducción de Ramón Dachs. (Barcelona: Vaso Roto, 2010) [in Spanish]
- Todorov, Tzvetan: L'arte o la vita! Il caso Rembrandt. Traduzione di Cinzia Poli. (Rome: Donzelli, 2011) [in Italian]
- Tummers, Annaand; Jonckheere, Koenraad (eds.): Art market and Connoisseurship: A Closer Look at Paintings by Rembrandt, Rubens and Their Contemporaries. (Amsterdam: Amsterdam University Press, 2008)
- Tummers, Anna: The Eye of the Connoisseur: Authenticating Paintings by Rembrandt and His Contemporaries. (Amsterdam: Amsterdam University Press, 2011) ISBN 978-1-60606-084-1
- Tümpel, Christian: Rembrandt mit Selbstzeugnissen und Bilddokumenten. (Reinbeck bei Hamburg: Rowohlt, 1977) [in German]
- Tümpel, Christian: Rembrandt: Mythos und Methode. (Königstein im Taunus: Langewiesche, 1986) [in German]
- Tümpel, Christian: Rembrandt: All the Paintings in Colour. (Antwerp: Fonds Mercator, 1993)
- Tümpel, Christian; Tümpel, Astrid: Rembrandt: Images and Metaphors. (London: Haus Books, 2006)
- Tümpel, Christian; et al.: Rembrandt en de Bijbel. (Zwolle: Waanders, 2006) ISBN 978-90-400-8283-2
- Valentiner, Wilhelm R.: Rembrandt und seine Umgebung. (Straßburg: Heitz & Mündel, 1905) [in German]
- Valentiner, Wilhelm R.: Rembrandt in Bild und Wort, ed. Wilhelm von Bode. (Berlin: Rich Bong Kunstverlag, 1907) [in German]
- Valentiner, Wilhelm R.: Rembrandt: Des Meisters Gemälde [3rd revised edition] (Klassiker der Kunst in Gesamtausgaben 2). (Stuttgart/Leipzig: Deutsche-Verlags Anstalt, 1909) [in German]
- Valentiner, Wilhelm R.: Rembrandt: Wiedergefundene Gemälde, 1910–1922 [revised ed.] (Klassiker der Kunst in Gesamtausgaben 27). (Stuttgart: Deutsche-Verlags Anstalt, 1923) [in German]
- Valentiner, Wilhelm R.: Rembrandt Paintings in America [2 vols.]. (New York, 1931)
- Valentiner, Wilhelm R.: Rembrandt: Des Meisters Handzeichnungen [2 vols.]. (Stuttgart/Berlin/Leipzig: Deutsche Verlags-Anstalt, 1925–34) [in German]
- Valentiner, Wilhelm R.: Rembrandt and Spinoza: A Study of the Spiritual Conflicts in Seventeenth-Century Holland. (London: Phaidon Press, 1957)
- Valéry, Paul: Le retour de Hollande. Descartes et Rembrandt. (Maastricht: A.A.M. Stols, 1926) [in French]
- Van Dyke, John Charles: Rembrandt and His School: A Critical Study of the Master and His Pupils with a New Assignment of Their Pictures. (New York: Charles Scribner's Sons, 1923)
- Wetering, Ernst van de; et al. (eds.): A Corpus of Rembrandt Paintings, Vol. I: 1625–1631; Vol. II: 1631–1634; Vol. III: 1635–1642. (Dordrecht: Martinus Nijhoff, 1982, 1986, 1989)
- Wetering, Ernst van de; Schackenburg, Bernhard (eds.): The Mystery of the Young Rembrandt. (Wolfratshausen: Edition Minerva, 2001) ISBN 3-932353-59-5
- Wetering, Ernst van de: Rembrandt's Hidden Self-Portraits. (Amsterdam: Museum Het Rembrandthuis, 2003)
- Wetering, Ernst van de; et al. (eds.): A Corpus of Rembrandt Paintings, Vol. IV: The Self-Portraits [Stichting Foundation Rembrandt Research Project]. (Dordrecht: Springer, 2005)
- Wetering, Ernst van de: Rembrandt: Quest of a Genius. (Amsterdam: Rembrandt House Museum; Zwolle: Waanders Publishers, 2007)
- Wetering, Ernst van de: Rembrandt in nieuw licht. (Amsterdam: Local World, 2009) [in Dutch]
- Wetering, Ernst van de; Retèl, Paulien: Rembrandt: The Painter at Work. (Oakland: University of California Press, 2009)
- Wetering, Ernst van de; et al. (eds.): A Corpus of Rembrandt Paintings, Vol. V: The Small-Scale History Paintings. (Dordrecht: Springer, 2011)
- Wetering, Ernst van de; et al. (eds.): A Corpus of Rembrandt Paintings, Vol. VI: Rembrandt's Paintings Revisited – A Complete Survey. (Dordrecht: Springer, 2014)
- Wetering, Ernst van de: Rembrandt: The Painter Thinking. (Oakland: University of California Press, 2016)
- Verdi, Richard: Rembrandt's Themes: Life into Art. (New Haven, CT: Yale University Press, 2014) ISBN 978-0300201536
- Verschoor, Gerdien: Het meisje en de geleerde. Kroniek van twee verloren gewaande Rembrandts. (Amsterdam: Uitgeverij Atlas Contact, 2019) ISBN 9789045037912 [in Dutch]
- Vogel-Köhn, Doris: Rembrandts Kinderzeichnungen. (Ph.D. diss., Universität Würzburg, 1974) [in German]
- Vogelaar, Christiaan; et al.: Rembrandt & Lievens in Leiden: Een jong en edel schildersduo. (Leiden: Stedelijk Museum De Lakenhal, 1991) [in Dutch]
- Vogelaar, Christiaan; et al.: Rembrandt's Mother. Myth and Reality. (Leiden: Stedelijk Museum De Lakenhal, 2005)
- Volkenandt, Claus: Rembrandt: Anatomie eines Bildes. (Munich: Wilhelm Fink, 2004) ISBN 978-3-7705-4002-0 [in German]
- Volkenandt, Claus: Rembrandt: Die Porträts. (Darmstadt: wbg Theiss in Wissenschaftliche Buchgesellschaft [WBG], 2019) ISBN 9783806239577 [in German]
- Wadum, Jørgen: Technical Art History: Painter's Supports and Studio Practices of Rembrandt, Dou and Vermeer. (Ph.D. diss., Universiteit van Amsterdam/University of Amsterdam, 2009)
- Wallace, Robert: The World of Rembrandt. (New York: Time-Life Books, 1968)
- Watkins, Catherine Bailey: Rembrandt's 1654 Life of Christ Prints: Graphic Chiaroscuro, the Northern Print Tradition, and the Question of Series. (Ph.D. diss., Case Western Reserve University, 2011)
- Wauschkuhn, Annette: Georg Simmels Rembrandt-Bild. Ein lebensphilosophischer Beitrag zur Rembrandtrezeption im 20. Jahrhundert. (Worms: Werner Verlag, 2002) [in German]
- Weber, Gregor J.M.; Hartog Jager, Hans den; Nooteboom, Cees: Rembrandt-Velázquez: Nederlandse en Spaanse meesters. (Amsterdam: Rijksmuseum Amsterdam, 2019) [in Dutch]
- Wegner, Wolfgang: Rembrandt und sein Kreis. Zeichnungen und Druckgraphic. (Munich: Staatliche Graphische Sammlung, 1966) [in German]
- Wencelius, Léon: Calvin et Rembrandt, étude comparative de la philosophie de l'art de Rembrandt et de l'esthétique de Calvin. (Paris: Société d'Edition [Les Belles Lettres], 1937) [in French]
- White, Christopher; Alexander, David; D'Oench, Ellen: Rembrandt in Eighteenth-Century England. (New Haven: Yale Center for British Art, 1983)
- White, Christopher: Rembrandt as an Etcher: A Study of the Artist at Work [2 vols.]. (London: A. Zwemmer, 1969; 2nd ed., New Haven, CT: Yale University Press, 1999)
- White, Howard B.: Antiquity Forgot: Essays on Shakespeare, Bacon, and Rembrandt. (The Hague: Martinus Nijhoff, 1978)
- Wickhoff, Franz: Einige Zeichnungen Rembrandts mit biblischen Vorwürfen [Seminarstudien]. (Innsbruck: Verlag der Wagner'schen Universitäts-Buchhandlung, 1906) [in German]
- Wijnman, H.F.: Uit de kring van Rembrandt en Vondel. Verzamelde studies over hun leven en omgeving. (Amsterdam: Noord-Hollandsche Uitgevers Maatschappij, 1959) [in Dutch]
- Wilkie, Ken; Posthuma de Boer, Eddy: Op pad met Rembrandt. In en rondom Amsterdam. (Amsterdam: Bas Lubberhuizen, 2006) [in Dutch]
- Williams, Hilary: Rembrandt on Paper. (Los Angeles, CA: J. Paul Getty Museum, 2009)
- Williams, Julia Lloyd: Rembrandt's Women. (Munich: Prestel Verlag, 2001)
- Willis, Kelly Jo: Hendrickje Stoffels: Rembrandt van Rijn's Incarnation of Medea. (M.A. thesis, University of Cincinnati, 2000)
- Winzinger, Franz: Rembrandt Landschaftszeichnungen. (Baden-Baden: Woldemar Klein Verlag, 1953) [in German]
- Wischnitzer, Rachel: From Dura to Rembrandt: Studies in the History of Art. (Jerusalem: Center for Jewish Art, 1990)
- Wohlfromm, Gisela: Rembrandts Auseinandersetzung Mit Der Kunst Adam Elsheimers. (Frankfurt am Main: Peter Lang, 1997) [in German]
- Wright, Christopher: Rembrandt: Self-Portraits. (London: Gordon Fraser, 1982)
- Wubben, Arno: Zoektocht in Hartstocht. Bezoeken aan Rembrandtschilderijen wereldwijd. (Amsterdam: Uitgeverij Boekscout, 2017) ISBN 9789402235593 [in Dutch]
- Zeldin, Natalie Ann: Performing Touch in the Frick Self-Portrait (1658): An Examination of the Ruwe Manier in Late Rembrandt. (M.A. thesis, University of Texas at Austin, 2013)
- Zell, Michael: Protestant Imagery and Jewish Apologetics: Rembrandt's Encounterwith Rabbi Menasseh ben Israel. (Ph.D. diss., Harvard University, 1994)
- Zell, Michael: Reframing Rembrandt: Jews and the Christian Image in Seventeenth-Century Amsterdam. (Berkeley: University of California Press, 2002)
- Zell, Michael; Chong, Alan (eds.): Rethinking Rembrandt. (Zwolle: Waanders Publishers, 2002)
- Zink, Jörg: Was die Nacht hell macht. Weihnachten in Bildern von Rembrandt. (Eschbach im Markgräflerland: Verlag am Eschbach, 1982) [in German]
- Zink, Jörg: Was die Nacht hell macht. Rembrandt malt die Weihnachtsgeschichte. (Eschbach im Markgräflerland: Verlag am Eschbach, 1999) [in German]
- Zink, Jörg: Was die Nacht hell macht. Rembrandt als Maler der christlichen Botschaft. (Gütersloh: Gütersloher Verlagshaus, 2015) [in German]
- Zink, Jörg: In het licht: Rembrandt, schilder van de Bijbel. [Vertaling: Bertie van Zoest & Ger Meesters]. (Utrecht: Uitgeverij Kok, 2015) [in Dutch]

=== Journal articles, scholarly papers, essays, and book chapters ===
- Abastado P.; Chemla, D. (2007), 'Rembrandt's doctors,'. Medical Humanities 33(1): 35–37
- Adams, Henry (1984), 'If Not Rembrandt, Then His Cousin?,'. The Art Bulletin 66(3): 427–441
- Afek, A.; Friedman, T.; Kugel, C.; Barshack, I.; Lurie, DJ. (2009), 'Dr. Tulp's Anatomy Lesson by Rembrandt: the Third Day Hypothesis,'. Israel Medical Association Journal 11(7): 389–92
- Ahmad, Iftikhar (2008), 'Art in Social Studies: Exploring the World and Ourselves with Rembrandt,'. The Journal of Aesthetic Education 42(2): 19–37
- Alexander-Knotter, Mirjam (1999), 'An Ingenious Device: Rembrandt's Use of Hebrew Inscriptions,'. Studia Rosenthaliana 33(2): 131–159
- Alting, M.P.; Waterbolk, T.W. (1982), 'New light on the anatomical errors in Rembrandt's Anatomy Lesson of Dr. Nicolaas Tulp,'. J Hand Surg Am. 7(6): 632–4
- Baer, Ronni (2012), 'Of Cats and Dogs: Domestic Pets in Rembrandt and Dou,'. In: Een Kroniek voor Jeroen Giltaij: Kroniek van het Rembrandthuis. (Amsterdam: Rembrandthuis, 2012), pp. 63–9
- Bal, Mieke (1990), 'Dis‐semination: "Rembrandt" and the navel of the text,'. LIT: Literature Interpretation Theory 2(2): 145–166. doi:10.1080/10436929008580052
- Bal, Mieke; Vardoulakis, Dimitris (2011), 'An Inter-action: Rembrandt and Spinoza,'. In: Spinoza Now. Edited by Dimitris Vardoulakis. (Minneapolis: University of Minnesota Press, 2011), pp. 277–303
- Baldinucci, Filippo: 'Life of Rembrandt,' from Cominciamento e Progresso dell'arte d'intagliare in rame colle vita de' piu eccellenti maestri della stessa professione. 1686, in ed. Charles Ford. Lives of Rembrandt. (London: Pallas Athene, 2007), pp. 35–48. [in Italian]
- Baldwin, Robert (1984), 'Rembrandt's Visual Sources from Italy and Antiquity,'. Source: Notes in the History of Art 4(1): 22–29
- Baldwin, Robert (1985), '"On earth we are beggars, as Christ himself was": The Protestant Background to Rembrandt's Imagery of Poverty, Begging, and Sickness,'. Konsthistorisk Tidskrift (LIV) 3: 122–135
- Baldwin, Robert (1989), 'Rembrandt's New Testament Prints: Artistic Genius, Social Anxiety, and the Calvinist Marketed Image,'. In: Shelley Perlove (ed.), Impressions of Faith: Rembrandt's Biblical Etchings. (Dearborn: University of Michigan, 1989), pp. 24–34
- Banfi, A. (1931), 'Il Rembrandt di Simmel,'. In Id., Vita dell'arte, Opere, vol. V, E. Mattioli et G. Scaramuzza (dir.), Reggio nell'Emilia, Istituto Antonio Banfi, p. 329–337. [in Italian]
- Bankl, H.C.; Bankl, H. (2000), 'Dr. Nicolaas Tulp: A Critical View of Rembrandt's Anatomy Lesson,'. Wien Klin Wochenschr. 112(8): 368–71. [in German]
- Barker, Mary Christine (2010), 'Transcending Tradition: Rembrandt's Death of the Virgin 1639: A Re-Vision,'. Dutch Crossing: Journal of Low Countries Studies 34(2): 138–61. doi:10.1179/030965610X12726397286205
- Bauch, Kurt (1967), 'Ikonographischer Stil: Zur Frage der Inhalte in Rembrandt's Kunst,'. In: Studien zur Kunstgeschichte. (Berlin: De Grayter, 1967), pp. 123–151. [in German]
- Beirne, Brian Logan (2008), 'Painted into a Corner: Rembrandt's Bankruptcy Today,'. Journal of Transnational Law & Policy 18(1): 89–107
- Benesch, Otto (1956), 'Worldly and Religious Portraits in Rembrandt's Late Art,'. The Art Quarterly 19: 335–355
- Benesch, Otto (1970), 'Rembrandt's Artistic Heritage: From Goya to Cézanne,'. (Collected Writings, vol. 1, New York, 1970, pp. 57–82)
- Benesch, Otto (1973), 'Rembrandts Bild bei Picasso,'; in Benesch's Collected Writings, vol. 4 (London, 1973) [in German]
- Benjamin, Andrew (2017), 'Reading, Seeing and the Logic of Abandonment: Rembrandt's Self-Portrait as the Apostle Paul,'. In: Antonio Cimino, George Henry van Kooten & Gert Jan van der Heiden (eds.), Saint Paul and Philosophy: The Consonance of Ancient and Modern Thought. (De Gruyter, 2017), pp. 21–46
- Bergström, Ingvar (1966), 'Rembrandt's Double Portrait of Himself and Saskia at the Dresden Gallery: A Tradition Transformed,'. Nederlands Kunsthistorisch Jaarboek 17: 143–69
- Białostocki, Jan (1957), 'Bellori's Caravaggio and Sandrart's Rembrandt,'. Burlington Magazine 99(653): 274–275
- Białostocki, Jan (1957), 'Ikonographische Forschungen zu Rembrandts Werk,'. Münchner Jahrbuch der Bildenden Kunst 8: 195–210. [in German]
- Białostocki, Jan (1966), 'Rembrand's "Terminus": To Wolfgang Stechow,'. Wallraf-Richartz-Jahrbuch 28: 49–60
- Białostocki, Jan (1968), 'Rembrandt's 'Eques Polonus','. Oud Holland: Journal for Art of the Low Countries 84(2/3): 163–176. JSTOR 42712350
- Białostocki, Jan (1972), 'Rembrandt and Posterity,'. Nederlands Kunsthistorisch Jaarboek 23 (1972): 131–157. JSTOR 24705655
- Białostocki, Jan (1973), 'Der Sünder als tragischer Held bei Rembrandt. Bemerkungen zu neueren ikonographischen Studien über Rembrandt,'; in: von Simson, Otto Georg; Kelch, Jan (hrsg.): Neue Beiträge zur Rembrandt-Forschung. (Berlin: Mann, 1973), pp. 137–154. [in German]
- Białostocki, Jan (1984), 'A New Look at Rembrandt Iconography,'. Artibus et Historiae 5(10): 9–19
- Bille, Clara (1956), 'Rembrandt's Claudius Civilis at Amsterdam in 1734,'. Konsthistorisk Tidskrift 25(1–4): 25–30. doi:10.1080/00233605608603564
- Binstock, Benjamin (1999), 'Rembrandt's Paint,'. RES: Anthropology and Aesthetics 36: 138–165
- Binstock, Benjamin (2001), 'I've Got You under My Skin: Rembrandt, Riegl and the Will of Art History,'. In: Richard Woodfield (ed.), Framing Formalism: Riegl's Work. (Amsterdam: G&B International, 2001), pp. 219–63
- Binstock, Benjamin (2001), 'The Ruins of Rembrandt,'. Dutch Crossing: Journal of Low Countries Studies 25(2): 323–341. doi:10.1080/03096564.2001.11730803
- Binstock, Benjamin (2003), 'Seeing Representations; or, The Hidden Master in Rembrandt's Syndics,'. Representations 83(1): 1–37. doi:10.1525/rep.2003.83.1.1
- Binstock, Benjamin (2006), 'The Birth of Rembrandt,'. In: M. Roscam Abbing (ed.), Rembrandt 2006: Essays. (Amsterdam: Foleor, 2006), pp. 267–78
- Black, Peter (2018), 'Rembrandt: paragon of the etching revival,'. In: Seifert, C. T. (ed.) Rembrandt: Britain's Discovery of the Master. (Edinburgh: National Galleries Scotland, 2018), pp. 107–113
- Blanc, Jan (2009), 'Rembrandt and the Historical Construction of His Conspiracy of Claudius Civilis,'. In: L. Cruz & W. Frijhoff (eds.), Myth in History, History in Myth. (Leiden, 2009), pp. 237–53
- Bok, Marten Jan (2004), 'Rembrandt's Fame and Rembrandt's Failure: The Market for History Paintings in the Dutch Republic,'. In: A. Kofuku (ed.), Rembrandt and Dutch History Painting in the 17th Century. (Tokyo, 2004), pp. 159–180
- Bok, Marten Jan; van der Molen, Tom (2009), 'Productivity Levels of Rembrandt and His Main Competitors in the Amsterdam Art Market,'. Jahrbuch der Berliner Museen 51. Bd., Beiheft. Rembrandt – Wissenschaft auf der Suche. Beiträge des Internationalen Symposiums Berlin – 4. und 5. November 2006: 61–68
- Borowitz, Helen O. (1983), 'The Rembrandt and Monet of Marcel Proust,'. The Bulletin of the Cleveland Museum of Art 70(2): 73–95
- Bourne, R.G. (2000), 'Did Rembrandt's Bathsheba really have breast cancer?,'. Aust N Z J Surg. 70(3): 231–2
- Bracken, W. Worth (2011), 'So as to give birth to your own inventions, too': Rembrandt transforming Annibale,'. In: Aemulatio. Imitation, emulation and invention in Netherlandish art from 1500 to 1800. Essays in honor of Eric Jan Sluijter. (Zwolle, 2011), pp. 138–152
- Bracken, W. Worth (2018), 'Rembrandt's "Lamentation over the Dead Christ" at the British Museum: A Reconsideration,'. Master Drawings 56: 149–168
- Braider, Christopher (1998), 'The Fountain of Narcissus: The Invention of Subjectivity and the Pauline Ontology of Art in Caravaggio and Rembrandt,'. Comparative Literature 50(4): 286–315
- Braithwaite, P.A.; Shugg, D. (1983), 'Rembrandt's Bathsheba: the dark shadow of the left breast,'. Ann R Coll Surg Engl. 65(5): 337–8
- Behpoor, Bavand (2010), 'How Moghul Was Rembrandt? A Critique on a Global Laboratory of Infinite Multiplicities,'. Third Text 24(4): 501–504. doi:10.1080/09528822.2010.491389
- Broomhall, Susan; Spinks, Jenny (2009), 'Finding Rembrandt? Place, History, Experience and the Individual,'. Dutch Crossing: Journal of Low Countries Studies 33(1): 6–22. doi:10.1179/155909009X422464
- Broos, B.P.J. (1971), 'The 'O' of Rembrandt,'. Simiolus: Netherlands Quarterly for the History of Art 4(3): 150–84
- Broos, B.P.J. (1974), 'Rembrandt's Portrait of a Pole and His Horse,'. Simiolus: Netherlands Quarterly for the History of Art 7(4): 192–218
- Broos, B.P.J. (1976), 'Rembrandt and Lastman's "Coriolanus": The History Piece in 17th-Century Theory and Practice,'. Simiolus: Netherlands Quarterly for the History of Art 8(4): 199–228
- Broos, B.P.J. (1999), 'Rembrandt and His Picturesque Universe: The Artist's Collection as a Source of Inspiration,'. In: Rembrandt's Treasures, ed. Bob van den Boogert [exh. cat.]. (Amsterdam: Rembrandt House Museum; Zwolle: Waanders Publishers, 1999), pp. 91–13
- Broos, B.P.J. (2009), 'Rembrandt & Saskia: Recent Research,'. Jahrbuch der Berliner Museen 51. Bd., Beiheft. Rembrandt – Wissenschaft auf der Suche. Beiträge des Internationalen Symposiums Berlin – 4. und 5. November 2006 (2009): 9–15. JSTOR 25674330
- Broos, B.P.J. (2013), 'The Young Samuel van Hoogstraten Corrected by Rembrandt,'. In: The Universal Artof Samuel van Hoogstraten (1627–1678): Painter, Writer and Courtier, edited by Thijs Weststeijn. (Amsterdam: Amsterdam University Press, 2013), pp. 77–95
- Broude, Norma (1976), 'The Influence of Rembrandt Reproductions on Seurat's Drawing Style: A Methodological Note,'. Gazette des Beaux-Arts 1293: 155–60
- Brown, Christopher (2009), 'Rembrandt and Realism For Görel Cavalli-Björkman,'. Konsthistorisk Tidskrift 78(1): 1–15. doi:10.1080/00233600802686416
- Bruyn, J. (1970), 'Rembrandt and the Italian Baroque,'. Simiolus: Netherlands Quarterly for the History of Art 4: 28–48
- Bruyn, J. (1990), 'An Unknown Assistant in Rembrandt's Workshop in the Early 1660s,'. The Burlington Magazine 132(1051): 714–718
- Budick, Sanford (1988), 'Rembrandt's Jeremiah,'. Journal of the Warburg and Courtauld Institutes 51: 260–264
- Budick, Sanford (1991), 'Rembrandt's and Freud's "Gerusalemme Liberata",'. Social Research 58(1): 189–207
- Budick, Sanford (1997), 'Descartes's Cogito, Kant's Sublime, and Rembrandt's Philosophers: Cultural Transmission as Occasion for Freedom,'. Modern Language Quarterly 58(1): 27–61. doi:10.1215/00267929-58-1-27
- Bulckens, Koen (2012), 'A Clash of Titans: The Rubens and Rembrandt Corpuses Compared,'. The Rubenianum Quarterly 3: 3–4
- Bulckens, Koen (2014), 'Cataloguing Rubens and Rembrandt: A Closer Look at the Corpus Rubenianum and the Rembrandt Research Project,'. Rubensbulletin (Koninklijk Museum voor Schone Kunsten Antwerpen) 5: 93–128
- Buvelot, Quentin (2017), 'Rembrandt in the Mauritshuis: Work in Progress,'. JHNA: Journal of Historians of Netherlandish Art 9(1). doi:10.5092/jhna.2017.9.1.11
- Cafritz, Robert C. (1988), 'Reverberations of Venetian Graphics in Rembrandt's Pastoral Landscapes,'. In: Robert C. Cafritz, Places of Delight: The Pastoral Landscape. (Washington, DC: Phillips Collection and National Gallery of Art, 1988), pp. 130–47
- Cailleux, Jean (1972), 'Esquisse d'une Etude sur le goût pour Rembrandt en France au XVIIIe siecle,'. Nederlands Kunsthistorisch Jaarboek (NKJ) / Netherlands Yearbook for History of Art 23: 159–166. JSTOR 24705656 [in French]
- Campbell, Louise (2014), 'Drawing Attention: John Postle Heseltine, the Etching Revival and Dutch Art of the Age of Rembrandt,'. Journal of the History of Collections 26(1): 103–15
- Carriveau, Gary W.; Shelley, Marjorie (1982), 'A Study of Rembrandt Drawings Using X-Ray Fluorescence,'. Nuclear Instruments and Methods in Physics Research 193(1–2): 297–301. doi:10.1016/0029-554X(82)90713-3
- Carroll, Margaret D. (1981), 'Rembrandt as Meditational Printmaker,'. The Art Bulletin 63(4): 585–610
- Carroll, Margaret D. (1984), 'Rembrandt's "Aristotle": Exemplary Beholder,'. Artibus et Historiae 5(10): 35–56
- Carroll, Margaret D. (2017), 'The Blade and the Brush: Rembrandt's Slaughtered Ox and Anatomy of Doctor Deyman'. Oxford Art Journal 40(3): 347–369. doi:10.1093/oxartj/kcx035
- Cersoy, Sophie; Sanyova, Jana; Richardin, Pascale; Laprévote, Olivier; Walter, Philippe; Brunelle, Alain (2011), 'Unexpected Materials in a Rembrandt Painting Characterized by High Spatial Resolution Cluster-TOF-SIMS Imaging,'. Analytical Chemistry 83(3): 753–760. doi:10.1021/ac1017748
- Chapman, H. Perry (2005), 'The Imagined Studios of Rembrandt and Vermeer,'. In: Inventions of the Studio, Renaissance to Romanticism, edited by Michael Cole and Mary Pardo. (Chapel Hill, NC: University of North Carolina Press, 2005), pp. 108–46
- Chapman, H. Perry (2010), 'Reclaiming the Inner Rembrandt: Passion and Rembrandt's Earliest Self-Portraits,'. In: The Passions in the Art of the Early Modern Netherlands, edited by Herman Roodenburg and Stephanie Dickey. Nederlands Kunsthistorisch Jaarboek 60 (2010): 188–215
- Chapman, H. Perry (2014), 'Rembrandt's Laughter and the Love of Art,'. In: Midwestern Arcadia: Essays in honor of Alison Kettering. Northfield, 2014
- Chapman, H. Perry (2014), 'Rembrandt and Caravaggio: Emulation without Imitation,'. In: Caravaggio: Reflections and Refractions, edited by Lorenzo Pericolo and David M. Stone. (Aldershot and Burlington, VT: Ashgate, 2014), pp. 273–300
- Chapman, H. Perry (2017), 'Rubens, Rembrandt, and the Spousal Model/Muse,'. In: Melion, Walter; Woodall, Joanna; Zell, Michael: Ut pictura amor: The Reflexive Imagery of Love in Artistic Theory and Practice, 1500–1700. (Leiden: Brill, 2017) ISBN 9004346465), pp. 439–482
- Chauí, Marilena (1996), 'Imanência e Luz: Espinosa, Vermeer e Rembrandt,'. Discurso 26: 113–130. [in Portuguese]
- Church, Brooke Peters (1930), 'Rembrandt: The First of the Moderns,'. The American Journal of Nursing 30(4): 429–435
- Clarke, Jean-Marie (1990), 'Le Philosophe en méditation du Louvre: Un tableau signé 'RHL van Rijn' et daté '1632,'. Revue du Louvre 40(3) [in French]
- Cohen, Alan (2000), 'How Deep was the Relationship between Rembrandt and the Jews?,'. In: 'Dutch Jewry: Its History and Secular Culture (1500–2000), edited by Jonathan Israel and Reinier Salverda. (Leiden: Brill, 2002), pp. 173–190
- Cohen, Janie L. (1983), 'Picasso's Exploration of Rembrandt's Art, 1967–72,'. Arts Magazine 58(2): 119–126
- Conn, Mark S. (2008), 'Rembrandt's Art: A Paradigm for Critical Thinking and Aesthetics,'. The Journal of Aesthetic Education 42(2): 68–82
- Coppier, André-Charles (1916), 'Rembrandt et Spinoza,'. Revue des deux mondes 31(1916): 160–91. [in French]
- Courtright, Nicola (1996), 'Origins and Meanings of Rembrandt's Late Drawing Style,'. The Art Bulletin 78(3): 485–510
- Craig, Kenneth M. (1983), 'Rembrandt and The Slaughtered Ox,'. Journal of the Warburg and Courtauld Institutes 46: 235–239
- Crenshaw, Paul (2001), 'Rembrandt's Disputes with His Patrons,'. Dutch Crossing: A Journal of Low Countries Studies 25(2): 162–99. doi:10.1080/03096564.2001.11730797
- Crenshaw, Paul (2013), 'The Catalyst for Rembrandt's Satire on Art criticism,'. JHNA: Journal of Historians of Netherlandish Art 5(2). doi:10.5092/jhna.2013.5.2.9
- Crenshaw, Paul (2017), 'Rembrandt and Hals Visit the Arundel Collection,'. JHNA: Journal of Historians of Netherlandish Art 9(1). doi:10.5092/jhna.2017.9.1.7
- Czernichowska, Joanna; Dmowska, Regina; Nowicka, Anna (2011), 'Two paintings by Rembrandt: "Girl in a picture frame" and "Scholar at his writing table" from the collection of the Royal Castle in Warsaw – history, examination and conservation,'. Opuscula Musealia. Czasopismo muzeologiczne 19: 9–23
- De Jongh, Eddy (1968), 'The Spur of Wit: Rembrandt's Response to an Italian Challenge,'. Delta: A Review of Arts, Life and Thought in the Netherlands 12(2): 49–67
- De Launay, Marc (2013), 'L’ « Aristote » de Rembrandt: une intervention de la peinture en philosophie,'. Methodos 13: 2–12. doi:10.4000/methodos.3147. [in French]
- De Winkel, Marieke (2005), "Rembrandt's Clothes: Dress and Meaning in His Self-Portraits,". In: Stichting Foundation Rembrandt Research Project, A Corpus of Rembrandt Paintings, 6 vols., ed. Josua Bruyn et al. (Dordrecht, Boston, and London, 1982–2014), 4: 45–87
- De Witt, David (2009), 'Rembrandt and the Climate of Religious Conflict in the 1620s,'. Jahrbuch der Berliner Museen 51. Bd., Beiheft. Rembrandt – Wissenschaft auf der Suche. Beiträge des Internationalen Symposiums Berlin – 4. und 5. November 2006: 17–24
- Desborde, Rene; Marshall, Kimball P. (2015), 'Rembrandt versus Van Gogh: A Qualitative Contrast Study Applying a Visual Arts Valuation Model,'. Proceedings of the Atlantic Marketing Association Annual Meeting, Savanah, GA., 24–26 September
- Di Matteo, Berardo; Tarabella, Vittorio; Filardo, Giuseppe; Tomba, Patrizia; Viganò, Anna; Marcacci, Maurilio (2016), 'Nicolaes Tulp: The Overshadowed Subject in The Anatomy Lesson of Dr. Nicolaes Tulp,'. Clin Orthop Relat Res. 474(3): 625–629. doi:10.1007/s11999-015-4686-y
- DiPaola, S.; Riebe, C.; Enns, J. (2010), 'Rembrandt's Textural Agency: A Shared Perspective in Visual Art and Science,'. Leonardo 43(2): 145–151
- Dickey, Stephanie S. (1986), 'Judicious Negligence: Rembrandt Transforms an Emblematic Convention,'. Art Bulletin 68: 253–262
- Dickey, Stephanie S. (1996), 'Mennonite Martyrdom in Amsterdam and the Art of Rembrandt and His Contemporaries,'. Proceedings of the American Association of Netherlandic Studies 9: 81–103
- Dickey, Stephanie S. (2007), 'Rethinking Rembrandt's Renaissance,'. Canadian Journal of Netherlandic Studies 21: 1–22
- Dickey, Stephanie S. (2011), 'Saskia as Glycera: Rembrandt's Emulation of an Antique Prototype,'. In: Anton Boschloo, et al. (eds.), Aemulatio: Emulation, Imitation, and Invention in Netherlandish Art. (Amsterdam: Waanders, 2011), pp. 233–247
- Dickey, Stephanie S. (2012), 'Strategies of Self-Portraiture from Hans von Aachen to Rembrandt,'. In: Lubmomír Konecny & Stepán Vácha (eds.), Hans von Aachen in Context: Proceedings of the International Conference, Prague, 22–25 September 2010. (Prague: Artefactum, 2012), pp. 72–81
- Dickey, Stephanie S. (2013), 'Begging for Attention: The Artful Context of Rembrandt's Etching Beggar Seated on a Bank,'. JHNA: Journal of Historians of Netherlandish Art 5(2). doi:10.5092/jhna.2013.5.2.8
- Dickey, Stephanie S. (2015), 'Contentione perfectus: Rembrandt and Annibale Carracci,'. In: Una Roman D'Elia (ed.), Rethinking Renaissance Drawings: Essays in Honour of David McTavish. (Montreal: McGill/Queens Press, 2015), pp. 262–277
- Dickey, Stephanie S. (2016), 'Rembrandt and his Circle,'. In: Wayne Franits (ed.), The Ashgate Research Companion to Dutch Art of the Seventeenth Century. (Aldershot: Ashgate, 2016), pp. 169–201
- Dickey, Stephanie (2017), 'Disgust and Desire: Responses to Rembrandt's Nudes,'. In: Debra Cashion, Henry Luttikhuizen and Ashley West, The Primacy of the Image in Northern European Art, 1400–1700. Essays in Honor of Larry Silver. (Brill, 2017) ISBN 978-90-04-35412-8), pp. 447–460
- Dickey, Stephanie (2017), 'Agape, Caritas, and Conjugal Love in Paintings by Rembrandt and Van Dyck,'. In: Walter S. Melion, Joanna Woodall, and Michael Zell (eds.), Ut Pictura Amor: The Reflexive Imagery of Love in Artistic Theory and Practice, 1500–1700. (Leiden/Boston: Brill, 2017), pp. 299–323
- Dickey, Stephanie S. (2017), 'Introduction: Rising Stars in Rembrandt's Amsterdam,'. In: Stephanie S. Dickey (ed.), Ferdinand Bol and Govert Flinck: New Research. (Zwolle: W. Books, 2017), pp. 6–19
- Dierick, Augustinus P. (1988), 'Julius Langbehn's "Rembrandt als Erzieher": Politics and Cultural Esthetics,'. Mosaic: An Interdisciplinary Critical Journal 21(1): 25–35. JSTOR 24777732
- Dierick, Augustinus P. (1990), 'Constructing and Deconstructing the Maker: Theun de Vries and J. Bernlef on Rembrandt and Vermeer/Van Meegeren,'. Dutch Crossing 14(42): 69–84. doi:10.1080/03096564.1990.11783952
- Döring, T. (2016), 'A new drawing by Rembrandt: study of a seated dog,'. Master Drawings 54: 369–378
- Downes, William Howe 1923), 'The Great Rembrandt Question,'. The American Magazine of Art 14(12): 661–666
- Drury, John (2008), 'Michelangelo and Rembrandt: the crucifixion,'. Word & Image 24(4): 349–366. doi:10.1080/02666286.2008.10406261
- Ekserdjian, David; Royalton-Kisch, Martin (2000), 'The Entombment of Christ: A Lost Mantegna Owned by Rembrandt?,'. Apollo 151(457): 52–56
- Eeles, Adrian (1998), 'Rembrandt's "Ecce Homo": A Census of Impressions,'. Print Quarterly 15(3): 290–296
- Espinel, C.H. (1997), 'A medical evaluation of Rembrandt. His self-portrait: ageing, disease, and the language of the skin,'. The Lancet 350(9094): 1835–7. doi:10.1016/S0140-6736(97)08504-8
- Espinel, C.H. (1999), 'Depression, physical illness, and the faces of Rembrandt,'. The Lancet 354(9174): 262–3. doi:10.1016/S0140-6736(05)66340-4
- Fernández, F. J. de Paz (2018), 'Rembrandt's Anatomy lessons,'. Neurosciences and History 6(1): 1–9
- Filipczak, Zirka Z. (2007), 'Rembrandt and the Body Language of Mughal Miniatures,'. Netherlands Yearbook for History of Art / Nederlands Kunsthistorisch Jaarboek 58(1): 162–187. doi:10.1163/22145966-90000746
- Finke, Ulrich (1964), 'Venezianische Rembrandtstecher um 1800,'. Oud Holland 79(1964): 111–121
- Fowler, Caroline (2018), 'Rembrandt's faceless faces,'. The Seventeenth Century 33(2): 133–159. doi:10.1080/0268117X.2017.1317016
- Franken, Michiel (2006), 'Learning by Imitation: Copying Paintings in Rembrandt's Workshop,'. In: Ernst van de Wetering et al., Rembrandt: Quest of a Genius. (Zwolle: Waanders, 2006), pp. 153–177
- Friedman, Tal; Lurie, Doron; Westreich, Melvyn (2007), 'Rembrandt's Sentinel Vein,'. Aesthetic Surgery Journal 27(1): 105–107. doi:10.1016/j.asj.2006.12.007
- Friedman, Tal; Lurie, Doron; Westreich, Melvyn; Golik, A. (2007), 'Rembrandt – Aging and Sickness: A Combined Look by Plastic Surgeons, an Art Researcher and an Internal Medicine Specialist,'. Israel Medical Association Journal 9(2): 67–71
- Friedman, Tal; Lurie, Doron; Shalom, A. (2012), 'Authentication of Rembrandt's self-portraits through the use of facial aging analysis,'. Isr Med Assoc J. 14(10): 591–4
- Fröhlich, Fanchon (1971), 'The Locations of Light in Art: from Rembandt to Op Art and Light Environment,'. British Journal of Aesthetics 11(1): 48–62
- Fry, Roger (1924), 'Rembrandt Problems,'. The Burlington Magazine for Connoisseurs 44(253): 188–192. JSTOR 862093
- Garrido, Coca (1998), 'Rembrandt grabador experimental y la sociedad de su tiempo,'. Arte, Individuo y Sociedad 10: 125–46. [in Spanish]
- Gaskell, Ivan (2007), 'Rembrandt's Genius, Wittgenstein's Warning,'. RES: Anthropology and Aesthetics 52: 97–106. JSTOR 20167745
- Gebhardt, Carl (1924), 'Rembrandt und Spinoza,'. Chronicon Spinozanum 4: 160–183. [in German]
- Gervais, David (1993), 'Rembrandt's Simplicity,'. The Cambridge Quarterly 22(1): 25–42. doi:10.1093/camqtly/XXII.1.25
- Gershman, Zhenya (2011), 'Rembrandt: The "I" Witness,'. Arion: A Journal of Humanities and the Classics, Boston University 19(2): 65–91
- Gershman, Zhenya (2014), 'Rembrandt: Turn of the Key,'. Arion: A Journal of Humanities and the Classics, Boston University 21(3): 79–108
- Gibian, George (1983), 'Doctor Zhivago, Russia, and Leonid Pasternak's Rembrandt,'; in John Garrard (ed.), The Russian Novel from Pushkin to Pasternak. (New Haven: Yale University Press, 1983), pp. 203–224
- Giltaij, Jeroen (2017), 'A Note on Rembrandt's Aristotle, Alexander, and Homer,'. JHNA: Journal of Historians of Netherlandish Art 9(1). doi:10.5092/jhna.2017.9.1.14
- Goethe, Johann Wolfgang von (1831), 'Rembrandt der Denker' [Rembrandt the Thinker], in the posthumous collection of Goethe's works (1831) [in German]
- Golahny, Amy (1983), 'Rembrandt's Early 'Bathsheba': The Raphael Connection,'. The Art Bulletin 65(4): 671–675. doi:10.1080/00043079.1983.10788120
- Golahny, Amy (1999), 'Rembrandt's Practical Approach to Italian Art: Three Variations,'. The Low Countries 7: 123–31
- Golahny, Amy (2000), 'Rembrandt's "Artemisia": Arts Patron,'. Oud Holland 14(2/4): 139–152. JSTOR 42712021
- Golahny, Amy (2001), 'Reception: Reflections on Rembrandt,'. Dutch Crossing: Journal of Low Countries Studies 25(2): 159–161. doi:10.1080/03096564.2001.11730796
- Golahny, Amy (2001), 'The Use and Misuse of Rembrandt: An Overview of Popular Reception,'. Dutch Crossing: Journal of Low Countries Studies 25(2): 305–322
- Golahny, Amy (2002), 'Rembrandt's Drawing of "Pyrrhus and Fabricius": A New Interpretation,'. Master Drawings 40(3): 243–248. JSTOR 1554524
- Golahny, Amy (2007), 'Selective Attention: Julius S. Held's Rembrandt Studies,'. Oud Holland: Journal for Art of the Low Countries 120(3/4): 181–190. JSTOR 42711736
- Golahny, Amy (2009), 'Rembrandt and Italy: Beyond the disegno-colore Paradigm,'. Jahrbuch der Berliner Museen Neue Folge 51: 113–120
- Golahny, Amy (2011), 'Rembrandt's Callisto: Unusual but not Unique,'. In: A. Boschloo, et al. (eds.): Aemulatio, Imitation, Emulation and Invention in Netherlandish Art from 1500 to 1800. Essays in honor of Eric Jan Sluijter. (Zwolle: Waanders, 2011), pp. 318–25
- Golahny, Amy (2012), 'Lievens and Rembrandt: Parallels and Divergences,'. The Low Countries 20: 189–92
- Golahny, Amy (2016), 'Rembrandt and "Everyday Life": The Fusion of Genre and History,'. In: Genre Imagery in Early Modern Northern Europe: New Perspectives, edited by Arthur J. DiFuria. (New York: Routledge, 2016), pp. 161–183
- Golahny, Amy (2017), 'Early Reception of Rembrandt's Hundred Guilder Print: Jan Steen's Emulation,'. JHNA: Journal of Historians of Netherlandish Art 9(1). doi:10.5092/jhna.2017.9.1.10
- Goldsmith, Steven (2014), 'Almost Gone: Rembrandt and the Ends of Materialism,'. New Literary History 45(3): 411–443. doi:10.1353/nlh.2014.0029
- Gordenker, Emilie E. S.; Noble, Petria (2013), 'Rembrandt's Saul and David at the Mauritshuis: A Progress Report,'. JHNA: Journal of Historians of Netherlandish Art 5(2). doi:10.5092/jhna.2013.5.2.11
- Grasman, Edward (1999), 'The Rembrandt Research Project: reculer pour mieux sauter,'. Oud Holland: Journal for Art of the Low Countries 113(3): 153–160
- Gross, Charles G. (1998), 'Rembrandt's The Anatomy Lesson of Dr. Joan Deijman,'. Trends in Neurosciences 21(6): 237–40. doi:10.1016/S0166-2236(97)01158-2
- Hage, J. Joris; Lange, Jan; Karim, Refaat B. (2019), 'Rembrandt's Aging Face in Plastic Surgical Perspective,'. Annals of Plastic Surgery 83(2): 123–131. doi:10.1097/SAP.0000000000001917
- Harris, J. C. (2013), 'Rembrandt van Rijn: Self-portrait 1660,'. JAMA Psychiatry 70(2): 136–137. doi:10.1001/jamapsychiatry.2013.823
- Harris, P. (1995), 'Rembrandt and medicine,'. J R Coll Surg Edinb. 40(2): 81–3
- Hassine, Juliette (2006), 'Correspondance des arts: Rembrandt-Dostoïevski dans l'Europe du vingtième siècle (In memoriam Jo Yoshida)'. (Department Bulletin Paper, Kyoto University, 2006/06/20). doi:10.14989/138068. [in French]
- Haver, William (2005), 'The Art of Dirty Old Men: Rembrandt, Giacometti, Genet,'. Parallax 11(2): 25–35. doi:10.1080/13534640500058467
- Haverkamp-Begemann, Egbert (1963), 'Rembrandt's So-Called Portrait of Anna Wymer as Minerva,'. In: Studies in Western Art: Acts of the Twentieth International Congress of the History of Art, New York, 1961, 3: 59–63
- Haverkamp-Begemann, Egbert (1967), 'Purpose and Style: Oil Sketches of Rubens, Jan Brueghel, Rembrandt,'. In: Akten des 21. Internationalen Kongresses für Kunstgeschichte in Bonn 1964: Stil und Überlieferung in der Kunst des Abendlandes, 3: 104–13
- Haverkamp-Begemann, Egbert (1971), 'The Present State of Rembrandt Studies,'. The Art Bulletin 53(1): 88–104
- Haverkamp-Begemann, Egbert (1971), 'The Sketch, Its Function in the Hands of Three Masters: Rubens, Rembrandt, Jan Brueghel,'. Art News Annual 37: 57–74
- Haverkamp-Begemann, Egbert (1972), 'Rembrandt as Teacher,'. In: Actes du XXIIe Congres International d'histoire de l'art. Budapest 1969: Evolution generale et développements régionaux en histoire de l'art, edited by György Rósza, pp. 105–13
- Haverkamp-Begemann, Egbert (1973), 'Rembrandt's Night Watch and the Triumph of Mordecai,'. In: Album Amicorum J. G. van Gelder, edited by Joos Bruyn, et al., (The Hague: Martinus Nijhoff, 1973), pp. 5–8
- Haverkamp-Begemann, Egbert (1989), 'Rembrandt as a Draughtsman: The Changing Image 1956–1988,'. Master Drawings 27(2): 105–10
- Haverkamp-Begemann, Egbert (2005), 'Rembrandt's Drawing The Raising of the Cross in the Museum of Fine Arts, Boston,'. In: The Learned Eye: Regarding Art, Theory, and the Artist's Reputation. Essays for Ernst van de Wetering, edited by Marieke van den Doel, et al. (Amsterdam: Amsterdam University Press, 2005), pp. 39–46
- Hecht, Peter (1998), 'Rembrandt and Raphael Back to Back: The Contribution of Thoré,'. Simiolus: Netherlands Quarterly for the History of Art 26(3): 162–78
- Hedquist, Valerie (1994), 'Rembrandt and the Franciscans of Amsterdam,'. Dutch Crossing 4 (Summer 1994): 20–49
- Held, Julius S. (1944), 'Rembrandt's "Polish" Rider,'. The Art Bulletin 26(4): 246–265
- Held, Julius S. (1984), 'A Rembrandt "Theme",'. Artibus et Historiae 5(10): 21–34
- Hellerstedt, K.J. (1981), 'A Traditional Motif in Rembrandt's Etchings: The Hurdy-Gurdy Player,'. Oud Holland: Journal for Art of the Low Countries 95(1): 16–30
- Herrin, Amanda K. (2011), 'Reading Light: Vision as a Hermeneutic Mechanism in Rembrandt's Etching Joseph Telling his Dreams (1638),'. Dutch Crossing 35(3): 249–274. doi:10.1179/155909011X13124528227507
- Hinterding, Erik (1993), 'The History of Rembrandt's Copperplates: with a Catalogue of Those that Survive,'. Simiolus: Netherlands Quarterly for the History of Art 22(4): 253–315
- Hirschfelder, Dagmar (2009), 'Tronie und bürgerliches Kostümporträt im Werk Rembrandts und seiner Nachfolger,'. In: Holm, Bevers (ed.): Rembrandt - Wissenschaft auf der Suche [Jahrbuch der Berliner Museen; N.F. 51, Beih.]. (Berlin, 2009), pp. 49–59
- Hirst, Michael (1968), 'Rembrandt and Italy,'. The Burlington Magazine 110(781): 221–223
- Hollander, Martha (2003), 'Losses of Face: Rembrandt, Masaccio, and the Drama of Shame,'. Social Research 79(4): 1327–50
- Holmes, C. J. (1906), 'The Development of Rembrandt as an Etcher. Article II-Rembrandt, 1630–1636,'. The Burlington Magazine for Connoisseurs 9(40): 245–253
- Holmes, C. J. (1906), 'The Development of Rembrandt as an Etcher. Article III (1636–1650),'. The Burlington Magazine for Connoisseurs 9(41): 313–323
- Holmes, C. J. (1907), 'Rembrandt and Jan Pynas,'. The Burlington Magazine for Connoisseurs 12(56): 102–105
- Hughes, Robert (2006), 'The God of Realism,'. The New York Review of Books 53(6)
- Huygens, Constantijn (1628/1629), 'Autobiography of Constantijn Huygens' (The Hague: Koninklijke Bibliotheek). Published in Oud Holland: Journal for Art of the Low Countries (1891), translated by Benjamin Binstock.
- Ijpma, Frank F.A.; van Gulik, T. M. (2018), 'Anatomy lesson of the brain and cerebral membranes captured on canvas by Rembrandt in 1656,'. British Journal of Surgery 105(5): 1–7. doi:10.1002/bjs.10610
- IJpma, Frank F.A.; van de Graaf, Robert C.; Nicolai, J.-P. A.; Meek, M. F. (2006), 'The Anatomy Lesson of Dr. Nicolaes Tulp by Rembrandt (1632): A Comparison of the Painting With a Dissected Left Forearm of a Dutch Male Cadaver,'. The Journal of Hand Surgery 31(6): 882–91. doi:10.1016/j.jhsa.2006.02.014
- Israëls, Jozef (1906), 'Rembrandt,'. The Collector and Art Critic 4(12): 336–340
- Jackowe, D.J.; Moore, M.K.; Bruner, A.E.; Friedieu, J.R. (2007), 'New Insight into the Enigmatic White Cord in Rembrandt's The Anatomy Lesson of Dr. Nicolaes Tulp (1632),'. Journal of Hand Surgery 32(9): 1471–76. doi:10.1016/j.jhsa.2007.07.006
- Jaffé, Michael (1994), '"Abraham's Sacrifice": A Rembrandt of the 1660s,'. Artibus et Historiae 15(30): 193–210
- Janssens, K.; et al. (2016), 'Rembrandt's ‘Saul and David’ (c. 1652): Use of multiple types of smalt evidenced by means of non-destructive imaging,'. Microchemical Journal 126: 515–523. doi:10.1016/j.microc.2016.01.013
- Jáuregui, Raúl (1997), 'Rembrandt Portraits: Economic Negligence in Art Attribution,'. UCLA Law Review 44 (1997): 1947–2030
- Joachimides, Alexis (2011), 'Rembrandt als Vorbild englischer Künstler im 18. Jahrhundert. Eine kontroverse Entscheidung,'. Zeitschrift für Kunstgeschichte 74(2): 217–236. JSTOR 41310770. [in German]
- Joby, Christopher (2004), 'How Does the Work of Rembrandt van Rijn Represent a Calvinist Aesthetic?,'. Theology 107(835): 22–29
- Johnson, C. Richard Jr. (2020), 'Decision Trees for Watermark Identification in Rembrandt's Etchings,'. JHNA: Journal of Historians of Netherlandish Art 12(2). doi:10.5092/jhna.12.2.5
- Jonker, Matthijs (2008), 'Meaning in Art History: A Philosophical Analysis of the Iconological Debate and the Rembrandt Research Project,'. De Zeventiende Eeuw 24(2): 146–161
- Jonker, Menno (2017), 'Rembrandt's Philosopher: Aristotle in the Eye of the Beholder,'. JHNA: Journal of Historians of Netherlandish Art 9(1). doi:10.5092/jhna.2017.9.1.12
- Judson, J.R. (1964), 'Pictorial sources for Rembrandt's Denial of St. Peter,'. Oud Holland: Journal for Art of the Low Countries 79(3): 141–151. JSTOR 42712156
- Kahr, Madlyn (1965), 'A Rembrandt Problem: Haman or Uriah?,'. Journal of the Warburg and Courtauld Institutes 28: 258–273
- Kahr, Madlyn (1968), 'Rembrandt's Meaning,'. Oud Holland: Journal for Art of the Low Countries 83(1): 63–68. JSTOR 42717440
- Kalmar, Ivan (2012), 'Rembrandt's Orient: where Earth met Heaven,'. Chapter 6, in: Ivan Kalmar, Early Orientalism: Imagined Islam and the Notion of Sublime Power [Routledge Islamic Studies Series, 18]. (New York: Routledge, 2012)
- Kauffmann, Hans (1920), 'Rembrandt und die Humanisten vom Muiderkring,'. Jahrbuch der Preuszischen Kunstsammlungen 41: 46–81. [in German]
- Kearsley, John H. (2011), 'Rembrandt, Michelangelo, and Stories of Healing,'. Journal of Pain and Symptom Management 42(5): 783–787. doi:10.1016/j.jpainsymman.2011.05.004
- Kettering, Alison McNeil (1977), 'Rembrandt's 'Flute Player': A Unique Treatment of Pastoral,'. Simiolus: Netherlands Quarterly for the History of Art 9(1): 19–44
- Kettering, Alison McNeil (2011), 'Rembrandt and the Male Nude,'. In A. Boschloo, et al. (eds.): Aemulatio, Imitation, Emulation and Invention in Netherlandish Art from 1500 to 1800. Essays in honor of Eric Jan Sluijter. (Zwolle: Waanders, 2011), pp. 248–262
- Kieft, Ghislain; van der Steen, Quirine (2010), 'Chapter 11: The Making of Rembrandt and Van Gogh,'; in Emmeline Besamusca, Jaap Verheul (eds.), Discovering the Dutch: On Culture and Society of the Netherlands. (Amsterdam: Amsterdam University Press, 2010), pp. 149–161
- Klein, Peter (2005), 'The Use of Wood in Rembrandt's Workshop. Wood Identification and Dendrochronological Analyses,'. In: The Learned Eye: Regarding art, theory and the artist's reputation, edited by Natasja van Eck, Marieke van den Doel, Gerbrand Korevaar, Anna Tummers and Thijs Weststenijn. (Amsterdam: Amsterdam University Press, 2005), pp. 28–37
- Koerner, Joseph Leo (1986), 'Rembrandt and the Epiphany of the Face,'. RES: Anthropology and Aesthetics 12: 5–32
- Koering, Jérémie (2017), 'Rembrandt mis à mort par la peinture même,'. Revue de l'art 197: 9–15. [in French]
- Koos, Marianne (2017), 'Verkörperung - Entkörperung bei Rembrandt,'. Zeitschrift für Kunstgeschichte 80(3): 349–391. [in German]
- Kopelman, Loretta M.; De Ville, Kenneth A. (2003), 'Rembrandt's Anatomy Lesson as a Metaphor for Education,'. Current Surgery 60(2): 150–1. doi:10.1016/S0149-7944(02)00736-5
- Koslow, Susan (2017), 'Aristotle's Apron,'. JHNA: Journal of Historians of Netherlandish Art 9(1). doi:10.5092/jhna.2017.9.1.13
- Koziel, Andrzej (2008), 'Rembrandt van Rijn i Michael Willmann, czyli historia upadku pewnego mitu,' [Rembrandt van Rijn and Michael Willmann, or a Story of dispelling a certain Myth]. Rocznik Historii Sztuki 33: 153–176. [in Polish]
- Kruger, Lawrence (2005), 'The Scientific Impact of Dr. N. Tulp, Portrayed in Rembrandt's "Anatomy Lesson",'. Journal of the History of the Neurosciences 14(2): 85–92. doi:10.1080/096470490513499
- Krupiński, Janusz (2006), 'Obraz a malowidło. Rembrandt contra Ingarden,'. Estetyka i Krytyka 2(11): 15–44. [in Polish]
- Krzyżagórska-Pisarek, Katarzyna (2016), 'Corpus Rubenianum versus Rembrandt Research Project: Two approaches to a catalogue raisonné,'. Rocznik Historii Sztuki 41: 23–50. doi:10.11588/diglit.34225.5
- Kuretsky, Susan Donahue (1977), 'Rembrandt at the Threshold,'. In: Rembrandt, Rubens and the Art of Their Time: Recent Perspectives, edited by Roland E. Fleischer and Susan C. Scott. (University Park, PA: Pennsylvania State University Press, 1977), pp. 61–105
- Kuretsky, Susan Donahue (1994), 'Worldly Creation in Rembrandt's "Landscape with Three Trees",'. Artibus et Historiae 15(30): 157–91. JSTOR 1483479
- Kuretsky, Susan Donahue (2011), 'Rembrandt's Cat,'. In: A. Boschloo, et al. (eds.): Aemulatio, Imitation, Emulation and Invention in Netherlandish Art from 1500 to 1800. Essays in honor of Eric Jan Sluijter. (Zwolle: Waanders, 2011), pp. 263–76
- Kurlansky, Mark (2016), 'Chapter 11: Rembrandt's Discovery'; in: Mark Kurlansky, Paper: Paging Through History. (New York: W.W. Norton & Company, 2016)
- Lackey, Douglas P. (2006), 'Rembrandt and the Mythology of the Self-portrait,'. Philosophical Forum 37(4): 439–455. doi:10.1111/j.1467-9191.2006.00247.x
- Lakke J.P. (1998), 'Autopsy Practices for Brain Dissections and Rembrandt's Anatomy Lesson of Dr. Deyman,'. Journal of the History of the Neurosciences 7(2): 101–7. doi:10.1076/jhin.7.2.101.1869
- Landsberger, Franz (1954), 'Rembrandt and Josephus,'. The Art Bulletin 36(1): 62–63. JSTOR 3047531
- Lawrence, Cynthia (1985), '"Worthy of Milord's house"? Rembrandt, Huygens and Dutch classicism,'. Konsthistorisk Tidskrift 54(1): 16–26. doi:10.1080/00233608508604067
- Lavin, Irving; Lavin, Marilyn Aronberg (2001), 'Rembrandt's 'Jewish Bride': Sister and Spouse,'. In: The Liturgy of Love: Images from the Song of Songs in the Art of Cimabue, Michelangelo, and Rembrandt, by Irving Lavin and Marilyn Aronberg Lavin. (The Franklin D. Murphy Lectures XIV, University of Kansas, 2001), pp. 84–104
- Leja, Jan (1996), 'Rembrandt's "Woman Bathing in a Stream",'. Simiolus: Netherlands Quarterly for the History of Art 24(4): 320–327
- Leperchey, F. (2000), 'Apropos of the "Lesson in anatomy",'. Morphologie 84(266): 5–12. [in French]
- Leroy, Paul (1954), 'Rembrandt: Educator of Humanity,'. The American Scholar 23(3): 310–320
- Levesque, Catherine (2015), 'Rembrandt's Etched Angels: Traces of the Divine,'. Dutch Crossing 39(2): 118–127. doi:10.1179/0309656415Z.00000000073
- Liedtke, Walter (1989), 'Reconstructing Rembrandt: Portraits from the Early Years in Amsterdam (1631–34),'. Apollo 129: 323–331
- Liedtke, Walter (1992), 'Rembrandt and the Rembrandt Style,'. Apollo 135: 140–45
- Liedtke, Walter (2004), 'Rembrandt's 'Workshop' revisited,'. Oud Holland: Journal for Art of the Low Countries 117(1/2): 48–73
- Litsardopoulou, Nafsika (2016), 'On the Expression of Emotions in Rembrandt's Art,'. Philosophia 46(3): 665–688
- Livingstone, M. S.; Conway, B. R. (2004), 'Was Rembrandt stereoblind?,'. New England Journal of Medicine 351(12): 1264–1265. doi:10.1056/NEJM200409163511224
- Konstam, Nigel (1977), 'Rembrandt's Use of Models and Mirrors,'. The Burlington Magazine 119(887): 94–98
- Macmillan, Duncan (2001), 'Rembrandt's intimate and tender eye,'. The Lancet 358(9283): 769–70 . doi:10.1016/S0140-6736(01)05896-2
- Magnien, Aline (2016), 'Rodin à la lumière de Rembrandt ou "De quoi Rembrandt est-il le nom?",'. Revue de l'art 191: 51–60. [in French]
- Maleuvre, Didier (2016), 'Rembrandt, or the portrait as encounter,'. In: Imaging Identity: Media, Memory and Portraiture in the Digital Age, edited by Melinda Hinkson. (Australia: ANU Press, 2016), pp. 15–35
- Mandell, J.B. (2005), 'Bathsheba's breast: Women, cancer & history,'. J Clin Invest 115(6): 1397. doi:10.1172/JCI25456
- Manuth, Volker (1993), 'Denomination and Iconography: The Choice of Subject Matter in the Biblical Painting of the Rembrandt Circle,'. Simiolus: Netherlands Quarterly for the History of Art 22(4): 235–252
- Marcus, Esther-Lee; Clarfield, A. Mark (2002), 'Rembrandt's Late Self-Portraits: Psychological and Medical Aspects,'. The International Journal of Aging and Human Development 55(1): 25–49. doi:10.2190/8LQ5-CC7W-UJDF-TNM0
- Marrades, Julián (2014), 'Rembrandt: la pintura y la visión,'. Pasajes 45: 83–90. [in Spanish]
- Marsh, Clive (1997), 'Rembrandt Reads the Gospels: Form, Context and Theological Responsibility in New Testament Interpretation,'. Scottish Journal of Theology 50(4): 399–413. doi:10.1017/S0036930600049735
- Martin, Gregory (1967), 'A Rembrandt Self Portrait from His Last Year,'. The Burlington Magazine 109(771): 354–355
- Martin, John Rupert (1986), 'Portraits of Doctors by Rembrandt and Rubens,'. Proceedings of the American Philosophical Society 130(1): 7–20
- Masquelet, A. C. (2005), 'The Anatomy Lesson of Dr. Tulp,'. Journal of Hand Surgery 30(4): 379–81. doi:10.1016/j.jhsb.2004.11.005
- McHenry, Deni McIntosh (1989), 'Rembrandt's "Faust in His Study" Reconsidered: A Record of Jewish Patronage and Mysticism in Mid-Seventeenth-Century Amsterdam,'. Yale University Art Gallery Bulletin (Spring 1989): 9–19
- McQueen, Alison (2000), 'Reinventing the Biography, Creating the Myth: Rembrandt in Nineteenth-Century France,'. Simiolus: Netherlands Quarterly for the History of Art 28(3): 163–180. JSTOR 3780942
- McQueen, Alison (2001), 'An Old Master Revivified: Rembrandt among 19th Century French Artists,'. Dutch Crossing 25(2): 221–242. doi:10.1080/03096564.2001.11730799
- Michalski, Sergiusz (2002), 'Rembrandt and the Church Interiors of the Delft School,'. Artibus et Historiae 23(46): 183–93
- Mitchell, Dolores (1994), 'Rembrandt's "The Anatomy Lesson of Dr. Tulp": A Sinner among the Righteous,'. Artibus et Historiae 15(30): 145–156
- Mondero, NE.; Crotty, RJ.; West, RW. (2013), 'Was Rembrandt strabismic?,'. Optom Vis Sci. 90(9): 970–9. doi:10.1097/OPX.0b013e31829d8d48
- Morris, Michael (2013), 'Realism and Representation: The Case of Rembrandt's Hat,'. European Journal of Philosophy 23(4): 909–932
- Müller, Jürgen (2013), 'Liebermann und Rembrandt - eine Skizze,'. In: Hedinger, Bärbel; Diers, Michael; Müller, Jürgen (eds.): Max Liebermann - Die Kunstsammlung. Von Rembrandt bis Manet. (München, 2013), pp. 65–72. [in German]
- Münz, Ludwig (1948), 'A Newly Discovered Late Rembrandt,'. The Burlington Magazine 90(540): 64–67
- Muth, Christopher C. (2017), 'Rembrandt's Senses: Lessons in 'Perceiving' the Patient,'. JAMA 317(8): 790–792. doi:10.1001/jama.2017.0553
- Nevitt Jr., H. Rodney (1997), 'Rembrandt's Hidden Lovers,'. Nederlands Kunsthistorisch Jaarboek (NKJ) / Netherlands Yearbook for History of Art 48: 162–191
- Niekerk, Carl (2007), 'Mahler, Rembrandt, and the Dark Side of German Culture,'. In: Legacies of Modernism: Art and Politics in Northern Europe, 1890–1950. Edited by P. McBride, R. McCormick, M. Zagar. (New York: Palgrave, 2007), pp. 29–40
- Niekerk, Carl (2010), 'Rembrandt and the Margins of German Culture,'. In: Reading Mahler: German Culture and Jewish Identity in Fin-de-Siècle Vienna, by Carl Niekerk. (Rochester, NY: Camden House, 2010), pp. 135–153
- Nieuwstraten, J. (1967), 'Haman, Rembrandt and Michelangelo,'. Oud Holland: Journal for Art of the Low Countries 82(1/2): 61–63. JSTOR 42711897
- Nordenfalk, Carl (1956), 'The new x‐rays of Rembrandt's Claudius Civilis,'. Konsthistorisk Tidskrift 25(1–4): 30–38
- Nutting, Catherine M. (2012), 'Embracing the Divine: Devotional Zeal and Mystical "Humanation" in Rembrandt's Annunciation Sketch,'. Illumine 11(1): 51–81
- O'Neill, Francis; Palazzo Corner, Sofia (2016), 'Rembrandt's self-portraits,'. Journal of Optics 18(8): 080401. doi:10.1088/2040-8978/18/8/080401
- Orenstein, Nadine (2013), 'Rembrandt Looks to Schongauer,'. JHNA: Journal of Historians of Netherlandish Art 5(2). doi:10.5092/jhna.2013.5.2.10
- Panofsky, Erwin (1920), 'Rembrandt und das Judentum', ed. Lise Lotte Moller. Jahrbuch der Hamburger Kunstsammlungen 18[1973]: 75–108. [in German]
- Parker, Andrew J. (2014), 'Revealing Rembrandt,'. Frontiers in Neuroscience 8(76). doi:10.3389/fnins.2014.00076
- Pereira, F. (2006), 'How Rembrandt reveals your beautiful, imperfect self. Life lessons from the master,'. Journal of the American Academy of Dermatology 55(4): 738–9. doi:10.1016/j.jaad.2006.06.021
- Pericolo, Lorenzo (2010), 'Nude in Motion: Rembrandt's Danae, and the Indeterminacy of the Subject,'; in Alexander Nagel & Lorenzo Pericolo (eds.), Subject in Aporia in Early Modern Art. (Aldershote: Ashgate, 2010), pp. 195–216
- Pericolo, Lorenzo (2014), 'The Golden Chain: Rembrandt's Cologne Self-Portrait or the Tragicomic Excellence of Painting,'; in Antonio Bechelloni & Enzo Neppi (eds.), De Turin à Paris: Laura Malvano historienne de l'art et critique militante. Hommage à sa vie et son oeuvre. Cahiers d'Études Italiennes 18: 131–47
- Perlove, Shelley (1989), 'Visual Exegesis: The Calvinist Context for Rembrandt's Etchings of the Life of Abraham,'. In: Shelley Perlove and Robert Baldwin: Impressions of Faith: Rembrandt's Biblical Etchings. (Dearborn: University of Michigan-Dearborn, Mardigian Library, 1989), pp. 11–23
- Perlove, Shelley (2001), 'Perceptions of Otherness: Critical Responses to the Jews of Rembrandt's Art and Milieu (1836–1945),'. Dutch Crossing 25(2): 243–290. doi:10.1080/03096564.2001.11730800
- Perlove, Shelley; Silver, Larry (2007), 'Rembrandt and the Dutch Catholics,'. Canadian Journal of Netherlandic Studies / Revue canadienne d'études néerlandaises 28: 53–75
- Piro, Joseph M. (2001), 'The Rembrandt Teaching Project: Promoting Multiple Literacies in Teaching and Learning,'. Art Education 54(3): 12–17. doi:10.2307/3193919
- Piro, Joseph M. (2007), 'Teaching Rembrandt,'. Humanities 28(6): 14–20
- Piro, Joseph M. (2008), 'Rembrandt and Collections of His Art in America: An NEH Curriculum Project,'. Journal of Aesthetic Education 42(2): 1–18. doi:10.1353/jae.0.0002
- Planche, Gustave (1853), 'Rembrandt, sa vie et ses oeuvres,'. Revue des deux mondes (1853) [in French]
- Podro, Michael (1987), Rembrandt's Woman Taken in Adultery,'. Journal of the Warburg and Courtauld Institutes 50: 245–252. JSTOR 751333
- Pollock, Griselda (1974), 'Vincent van Gogh, Rembrandt and the British Museum,'. The Burlington Magazine 116(860): 670–672
- Posèq, Avigdor W. G. (2009), 'A Proposal for Rembrandt's Two Versions of Slaughtered Ox,'. Artibus et Historiae 30(60): 271–6
- Preston, Frances L. (2001), 'Gersaint on Rembrandt: 'a son seul genie','. Dutch Crossing: A Journal of Low Countries Studies 25(2): 200–220. doi:10.1080/03096564.2001.11730798
- Proimos, Constantinos V. (2011), 'Forgiveness and Forgiving in Rembrandt's Return of the Prodigal Son (c. 1668),'. Art, Emotion and Value [5th Mediterranean Congress of Aesthetics] (2011): 291–300
- Proust, Marcel (1895), 'Chardin et Rembrandt' [unfinished essay] [in French]
- Prymak, Thomas M. (2011), 'Rembrandt's 'Polish Rider' in its East European Context,'. The Polish Review 56(3): 159–86
- Quodbach, Esmée (2005), '"Rembrandt's 'Gilder' Is Here": How America Got Its First Rembrandt and France Lost Many of Its Old Masters,'. Simiolus: Netherlands Quarterly for the History of Art 31(1/2): 90–107
- Rassieur, Tom (2001), 'When Things Get Rough for Rembrandt,'. Georgia Museum of Art Bulletin 21: 41–76
- Rich, Daniel Catton (1935), 'Rembrandt Remains,'. Parnassus 7(5): 3–5. doi:10.1080/15436314.1935.11467464
- Ricoeur, Paul (1992),' Sur un autoportrait de Rembrandt,'. Perspektiven der Philosophie 18: 135–139. [in French]
- Riegl, Alois (1902), 'Das Holländische Gruppenporträt,'. Jahrbuch des allerhöchstens Kaiserhauses XXII: 71–278. [in German]
- Riphagen, Marianne (2011), 'Darren Siwes: Dialogue with Rembrandt,'. Artlink 31(2): 78–81
- Robinson, Franklin W. (1967), 'Rembrandt's Influence in Eighteenth Century Venice,'. Nederlands Kunsthistorisch Jaarboek / Netherlands Yearbook for History of Art 18(1): 167–196. doi:10.1163/22145966-90000396
- Robinson, Franklin W. (1980), 'Puns and Plays in Rembrandt's Etchings,'. The Print Collector's Newsletter 11(5): 165–168
- Robinson, William W. (1998), 'Five Black Chalk Figure Studies by Rembrandt,'. Master Drawings 38(1): 36–46
- Rosenberg, Jakob (1956), 'Rembrandt the Draughtsman with Consideration of the Problem of Authenticity,'. Daedalus 86(2): 122–136
- Rosler R.; Young, P. (2011), 'La lección de anatomía del doctor Nicolaes Tulp: el comienzo de una utopía médica,' [The anatomy Lesson of Dr. Nicolaes Tulp: The beginning of a medical utopia]. Rev Med Chil. 139(4): 535–41. doi:10.4067/S0034-98872011000400018 [in Spanish]
- Rösler A.; Hofmann, M.; Mackenzie, M.; Harris, A.; Mapstone, M. (2001), 'Über „Successful Aging" hinaus: Rembrandt in seinen Selbstbildnissen,' [Beyond successful aging: Rembrandt in his self-portraits]. Psychiatr Prax. 28(2): 88–90. doi:10.1055/s-2001-11584 [in German]
- Rosales-Rodríguez, Agnieszka (2008), 'Nieuchwytny obraz Rembrandta. Georga Simmla filozoficzna próba interpretacji oeuvre holenderskiego mistrza,'. Rocznik Historii Sztuki 33: 247–258. doi:10.11588/artdok.00001456. [in Polish]
- Rosales-Rodríguez, Agnieszka (2008), 'Rembrandtowska "sztuka wyklęta". Mit zbuntowanego geniusza w XIX-wiecznej krytyce artystycznej i malarska polemika z akademizmem,' [Rembrandt's 'Cursed Art'. The Myth of Rebellious Genius in the 19th Century Artistic Criticism and Painting Polemics with Academism]. Rocznik Historii Sztuki 33: 231–245. doi:10.11588/artdok.00001457. [in Polish]
- Rosales-Rodríguez, Agnieszka (2014), 'Wspólna twarz – Różewicz, Rembrandt i starość,' [The common face: Różewicz, Rembrandt and old age]. Przestrzenie Teorii 21: 167–180. doi:10.14746/pt.2014.21.10. [in Polish]
- Rotermund, Hans-Martin (1952), 'The Motif of Radiance in Rembrandt's Biblical Drawings,'. Journal of the Warburg and Courtauld Institutes 15(3/4): 101–121
- Rotermund, Hans-Martin (1952), 'Rembrandt und Die Religiösen Laienbewegungen in Den Niederlanden Seiner Zeit,'. Nederlands Kunsthistorisch Jaarboek (NKJ) / Netherlands Yearbook for History of Art 4(1): 104–230. [in German]
- Rothenberg, Albert (1999), 'Rembrandt's self portraits: the creative process'. Paper presented at the annual meeting of the American Psychological Association, Boston, MA, 20–24 August 1999
- Rothenberg, Albert (1999), 'Depression, physical illness, and the faces of Rembrandt,'. The Lancet 354(9187): 1392. doi:10.1016/S0140-6736(05)76251-6
- Rothenberg, Albert (2008), 'Rembrandt's Creation of the Pictorial Metaphor of Self,'. Metaphor & Symbol 23(2): 108–29. doi:10.1080/10926480801944269
- Rosso, Corrado (1986), 'Diderot et Rembrandt: Une occasion perdue,'; in Diderot: Les Beaux-Arts et la musique. (Aix-en-Provence: Université de Provence, 1986), pp. 25–42
- Royalton-Kisch, Martin (1989), 'Rembrandt's Sketches for His Paintings,'. Master Drawings 27(2): 128–145
- Royalton-Kisch, Martin (1991), 'Rembrandt's Drawing of "The Entombment of Christ" over "The Raising of Lazarus",'. Master Drawings 29(3): 263–283
- Royalton-Kisch, Martin (1993), 'Rembrandt, Zomer, Zanetti and Smith,'. Print Quarterly 10(2): 111–122
- Royalton-Kisch, Martin (2000), 'From Rembrandt to Van Renesse: Some Re-Attributed Drawings,'. The Burlington Magazine 142(1164): 157–164
- Royalton-Kisch, Martin; Schatborn, Peter (2011), 'The Core Group of Rembrandt Drawings, II: The List,'. Master Drawings 49(3): 323–346
- Rubinstein, Gregory (2011), 'Brief Encounter: The Early Drawings of Jan Lievens and Their Relationship with Those of Rembrandt,'. Master Drawings 43(3): 352–370
- Rubiś, Wojciech; Tendera, Paulina (2014), 'Artistic Thinking – Thinking of the Essence (the Self-portraits of Rembrandt van Rijn),'. Estetyka i Krytyka 34(3): 101–118
- Russell, Margarita (1977), ' The Iconography of Rembrandt's "Rape of Ganymede",'. Simiolus: Netherlands Quarterly for the History of Art 9(1): 5–18
- Rutgers, Jaco (2004), 'A Source for Rembrandt's "Beheading of St John the Baptist",'. Print Quarterly 21(2): 154–156
- Sabar, Shalom (2008), 'Between Calvinists and Jews: Hebrew Script in Rembrandt's Art,'. In: Beyond the Yellow Badge: Anti-Judaism and Antisemitism in Medieval and Early Modern Visual Culture. Edited by Mitchell B. Merback. (Leiden: Brill, 2008), pp. 371–404
- Salcman, Michael (1995), 'The Anatomy Lesson of Dr. Deyman, Rembrandt van Rijn,'. Neurosurgery 36(4): 865–866. doi:10.1227/00006123-199504000-00034
- Samis, Peter S (1990), 'Aemulatio Rembrandti: The Nineteenth-Century Printmaker Flameng and His Prises/Crises de Conscience,'. Gazette des Beaux-Arts 6: 243–260
- Scallen, Catherine B. (1997), 'Rembrandt's Nocturne Prints,'. Art On Paper 1(3): 13–17
- Scallen, Catherine B. (1998), 'Rembrandt and the Northern Renaissance,'. In: Laurinda S. Dixon, ed., In Detail: New Studies of Northern Renaissance Art in Honor of Walter S. Gibson, Turnhout, 1998, pp. 135–150
- Scallen, Catherine B. (1999), 'Rembrandt's Reformation of a Catholic Subject: the Repentant and the Penitent Saint Jerome,'. Sixteenth Century Journal 30(1): 71–88
- Scallen, Catherine B. (2001), 'Guarding the Borders of Rembrandt Connoisseurship,'. Dutch Crossing: Journal of Low Countries Studies 25(2): 291–304. doi:10.1080/03096564.2001.11730801
- Scallen, Catherine B. (2002), 'Rembrandt in the Nineties,'. In: Alan Chong and Michael Zell, eds., Rethinking Rembrandt, Boston and Zwolle, 2002
- Scallen, Catherine B. (2006), 'Connoisseurships of Rembrandt,'. In: Michiel Roscam Abbing, ed., Around Rembrandt. Collected Essays on the Occasion of Rembrandt's 400th Anniversary, Foleor Press, 2006, pp. 63–73
- Scallen, Catherine B. (2009), 'The Global Rembrandt,'. In: Crossing Cultures: Conflict, Migration and Convergence: The Proceedings of the 32nd International Congress in the History of Art, edited by Jaynie Anderson. (Carlton: Miegunyah Press, 2009), pp. 263–267
- Scallen, Catherine B. (2017), 'Do mistakes always matter? Jakob Rosenberg's Rembrandt Life and Work','. Journal of Art Historiography 16 (June 2017)
- Schama, Simon (1985), 'Rembrandt and Women,'. Bulletin of the American Academy of Arts and Sciences 38(7): 21–47. JSTOR 20171780
- Schatborn, P. (1989), 'Notes on Early Rembrandt Drawings,'. Master Drawings 27(2): 118–127
- Schatborn, P.; et al. (2011), 'The Core Group of Rembrandt Drawings,'. Master Drawings 49: 293–351
- Scheller, R.W. (1961), 'Rembrandt's Reputatie van Houbraken tot Scheltema,'. Nederlands Kunsthistorisch Jaarboek 12: 81–119. [in Dutch]
- Scheller, R.W. (1968), 'Rembrandt en de Encyclopedische Verzameling,'. Oud-Holland 84: 81–147. [in Dutch]
- Schildkraut, J.J. (2004), 'Saint Jerome in a Dark Chamber: Rembrandt's Metaphoric Portrayal of the Depressed Mind,'. American Journal of Psychiatry 161(1): 26–27. doi:10.1176/appi.ajp.161.1.26
- Schirillo, James A. (2000), 'Hemispheric asymmetries and gender influence Rembrandt's portrait orientations,'. Neuropsychologia 38(12): 1593–606
- Schirillo, James A.; Susi, T.; Burdette, J.; Laurienti, P. (2002), 'Viewing portraits by Rembrandt: fMRI reveals cerebellar and prefrontal cortical involvement,'. Journal of Vision 2(7): 593. doi:10.1167/2.7.593
- Schirillo, James A.; Fox, Melissa A. (2006), 'Rembrandt's Portraits: Approach or Avoid?,'. Leonardo 29(3): 253–256
- Schirillo, James A. (2007), 'Gender's effect on the hemispheric laterality of Rembrandt's portraits,'. Spatial Vision 21: 19–26. doi:10.1163/156856807782753859
- Schirillo, James A.; J. Powell, W.R. (2008), 'Fearing Rembrandt's male portraits (Hess Revisited),'. Journal of Vision 8(6): 711. doi:10.1167/8.6.711
- Schirillo, James A.; Powell, W.R. (2011), 'Hemispheric laterality measured in Rembrandt's portraits using pupil diameter and aesthetic verbal judgements,'. Cognition & Emotion 25(5): 868–885. doi:10.1080/02699931.2010.515709
- Schirillo, James A. (2013), 'Pupil dilations reflect why Rembrandt biased female portraits leftward and males rightward,'. Frontiers in Human Neuroscience 7: 938. doi:10.3389/fnhum.2013.00938
- Schmidt-Degener, F. (1919), 'Rembrandt en Vondel,'. De Gids 83: 264–66. [in Dutch]
- Schwartz, Frederic (1989), '"The Motions of the Countenance": Rembrandt's Early Portraits and the Tronie,'. RES: Anthropology and Aesthetics 17/18: 89–116
- Schwartz, Gary (1978), 'Rembrandt: ‘Connoisseurship’ et érudition,'. Revue de l'art 42: 100–6
- Schwartz, Gary (1985), 'Rembrandt's David and Mephiboseth: a Forgotten Subject from Vondel,'. In: Tribute to Lotte Brand Philip: Art Historian and Detective. (New York: Abaris Books, 1985), pp. 166–74
- Schwartz, Gary (1985), 'Rembrandt's Patrons Among the Clans of Holland,'. Dutch Crossing 9(27): 3–16. doi:10.1080/03096564.1985.11784332
- Schwartz, Gary (2001), 'The Clones make the Master: Rembrandt in 1650,'. In: Horizonte: Beiträge zu Kunst und Kunstwissenschaft | Horizons: essais sur l'art et sur son histoire | orizzonti: saggi sull'arte e sulla storia dell'arte | Horizons: essays on art and art research. (Zürich: Schweizerisches Institut für Kunstwissenschaft, 2001), pp. 53–64
- Schwartz, Gary (2009), 'Rembrandt's Hebrews,'. Jahrbuch der Berliner Museen 51: 33–38. [Beiheft. Rembrandt – Wissenschaft auf der Suche. Beiträge des Internationalen Symposiums Berlin – 4. und 5. November 2006]. JSTOR 25674333
- Schwartz, Gary (2013), 'Rembrandt's Dürer'. (The text of a talk delivered by Gary Schwartz on 9 March 2013 at the opening of a sales exhibition of work on paper by both artists at Christopher-Clark Fine Art, 377 Geary Street, San Francisco)
- Schwartz, Gary (2014), 'A Corpus of Rembrandt Paintings as a Test Case for Connoisseurship,'. In: Connoisseurship: I'oeil, la raison et I'instrument, ed. Patrick Michel. (Paris: École du Louvre, 2014), pp. 229–37
- Schwartz, Gary (2014), 'The Meanings of Rembrandt,'. In: Rembrandt and the Dutch Golden Age [exh. cat.]. (Budapest: Szépmüvészeti Múzeum, 2014), pp. 36–57
- Sciolla, Gianni Carlo (2006), 'La Visitazione di Rembrandt già a Torino. Una rilettura critica,'. Artibus et Historiae 27(54): 191–199. [in Italian]
- Seidenstein, Joanna Sheers (2016), 'Grace, Genius, and the Longinian Sublime in Rembrandt's Aristotle with a Bust of Homer,'. JHNA: Journal of Historians of Netherlandish Art 8(2). doi:10.5092/jhna.2016.8.2.5
- Shapiro, Barbara Stern (1986), 'Camille Pissarro, Rembrandt and the Use of Tone,'. In: Studies on Camille Pissarro, edited by Christopher Lloyd. (New York: Routledge & Kegal Paul, 1986), pp. 123–35
- Slatkes, Leonard J. (1980), 'Rembrandt's Elephant,'. Simiolus: Netherlands Quarterly for the History of Art 11(1): 7–13
- Slive, Seymour (1953), 'Rembrandt and His Contemporary Critics,'. Journal of the History of Ideas 14(2): 203–220
- Slive, Seymour (1964), 'Rembrandt's 'Self-Portrait in a Studio','. The Burlington Magazine 106(740): 482–487
- Slive, Seymour (1965), 'An Unpublished Head of Christ by Rembrandt,'. The Art Bulletin 47(4): 407–417. JSTOR 3048299
- Sluijter, E.J. (1999), 'Emulating Sensual Beauty: Representations of Danaë from Gossaert to Rembrandt,'. Simiolus: Netherlands Quarterly for the History of Art 27(1/2): 4–45
- Sluijter, E.J. (2009), 'Rembrandt and the Rules of Art Revisited,'. Jahrbuch der Berliner Museum 51: 121–129
- Sluijter, E.J. (2010), 'Rembrandt's Portrayal of the Passions and Vondel's ‘Staetveranderinge’,'. Nederlands Kunsthistorisch Jaarboek 60: 285–304
- Sluijter, E.J. (2014), 'How Rembrandt surpassed the Ancients, Italians and Rubens as the Master of ‘the Passions of the Soul','. BMGN – Low Countries Historical Review 129(2): 63–89. doi:10.18352/bmgn-lchr.9541
- Sluijter, E.J. (2017), 'Breenbergh and Rembrandt in Dialogue,'. JHNA: Journal of Historians of Netherlandish Art 9(1). doi:10.5092/jhna.2017.9.1.8
- Smith, David R. (1982), 'Rembrandt's Early Double Portraits and the Dutch Conversation Piece,'. The Art Billetin 64(2): 259–288
- Smith, David R. (1995), 'Inversion, Revolution, and the Carnivalesque in Rembrandt's "Civilis",'. RES: Anthropology and Aesthetics 27: 89–110
- Smith, E.R.; du Rand, J.A. (2004), '"Preacher" Dexter Reading and Presentation. Rembrandt's, the Philosopher, in a Contemporary Age,'. Acta Patristica et Byzantina 15(1): 233–253. doi:10.1080/10226486.2004.11745744
- Smith, Ralph A. (2008), 'Rembrandt, Educational Standards, and Policy,'. Arts Education Policy Review 109(5): 3–8. doi:10.3200/AEPR.109.5.3-8
- Smith, Ralph A. (2008), 'Rembrandt and Learning,'. The Journal of Aesthetic Education 4(2): 101–114
- Stechow, Wolfgang (1944), 'Rembrandt – Democritus,'. Art Quarterly 7: 233–238
- Stechow, Wolfgang (1968), 'Some Observations on Rembrandt and Lastman,'. Oud Holland: Journal for Art of the Low Countries 84(2/3): 148–162
- Steiner, Gary (2010), 'The Cultural Significance of Rembrandt's "Anatomy Lesson of Dr. Nicolaas Tulp",'. History of European Ideas 36(3): 273–279. doi:10.1016/j.histeuroideas.2010.02.004
- Stone-Ferrier, Linda (1985), 'Views of Haarlem: A Reconsideration of Ruisdael and Rembrandt,'. The Art Bulletin 67(3): 417–436. doi:10.1080/00043079.1985.10788281
- Stratton, Susan (1986), 'Rembrandt's Beggars: Satire and Sympathy,'. The Print Collector's Newsletter 17(3): 78–82
- Stumpel, Jeroen (2000), 'A Twelfth Attempt: The Subject of Rembrandt's "History Piece" in Leiden,'. Simiolus: Netherlands Quarterly for the History of Art 28(1/2): 44–50
- Sullivan, Scott A. (1980), 'Rembrandt's Self-Portrait with a Dead Bittern,'. The Art Bulletin 62(2): 236–243
- Talbierska, Jolanta (2008), 'Twórczość graficzna Rembrandta van Rijn. Nowe perspektywy badawcze dzieła graficznego,' [Graphic art of Rembrandt van Rijn. New research perspectives of the graphic work]. Rocznik Historii Sztuki 33: 65–127. [in Polish]
- Talley, Mansfield Kirby Jr. (1989), 'Connoisseurship and the Methodology of the Rembrandt Research Project.'. International Journal of Museum Management and Curatorship 8(2): 175–214. doi:10.1016/0260-4779(89)90022-8
- Ten Kate, J.J.; Jennekens, F.G.I.; Vos-Niël, J.M.E. (2009), 'Rembrandt's 'Beggar with a Wooden Leg' and Other Comparable Prints,'. The Journal of Bone and Joint Surgery 91(2): 278–282. doi:10.1302/0301-620X.91B2.21747
- Tolstoy, Helen (2017), 'Rembrandt,'. Chapter 9, in: Helen Tolstoy, Akim Volynsky: A Hidden Russian-Jewish Prophet, translated and copyedited by Simon Cook. (Boston: Brill, 2017), pp. 160–178
- Tribout-Joseph, Sarah (2012), 'The Art Market in Proust: A Comparative Study of the Treatment of Rembrandt and the Salon Painter Gleyre in Proust,'. In: Proust and the Visual, edited by Nathalie Aubert, 1st ed., University of Wales Press, 2012, pp. 149–166
- Tümpel, Christian (1968), 'Ikonographische Beiträge zu Rembrandt. Zur Deutung und Interpretation seiner Historien,'. Jahrbuch der Hamburger Kunstsammlungen 13: 95–126. [in German]
- Tümpel, Christian (1969), 'Studien zur Ikonographie der Historien Rembrandts. Deutung und Interpretation der Bildinhalte,'. Nederlands Kunsthistorisch Jaarboek 20: 107–198. [in German]
- Tümpel, Christian (1971), 'Ikonographische Beiträge zu Rembrandt. Zur Deutung und Interpretation einzelner Werke,'. Jahrbuch der Hamburger Kunstsammlungen 16: 20–38. [in German]
- Tuman, Donna M. (2008), 'The Changing Face of Rembrandt: Pedagogy, Politics, and Cultural Values in American Art Education,'. The Journal of Aesthetic Education 42(2): 57–67
- Valentiner, Wilhelm R. (1931), 'Rembrandt Drawings in the Havemeyer Collection,'. Metropolitan Museum Studies 3(2): 135–146
- Valentiner, Wilhelm R. (1948), 'Rembrandt's Conception of Historical Portraiture,'. Art Quarterly 11(1948): 117–135
- Van Breda, Jacobus (1997), 'Rembrandt Etchings on Oriental Papers: Papers in the Collection of the National Gallery of Victoria,'. Art Bulletin of Victoria 38 (1997): 25–38
- Van de Waal, H. (1956), 'The iconological background of Rembrandt's Civilis,'. Konsthistorisk Tidskrift 25(1–4): 11–25. doi:10.1080/00233605608603563
- Van de Wetering, Ernst; Broekhoff, Paul (1996), 'New Directions in the Rembrandt Research Project, Part I: The 1642 Self-Portrait in the Royal Collection,'. The Burlington Magazine 138(1116): 174–180
- Van de Wetering, Ernst (1997), 'The Miracle of Our Age: Rembrandt through the Eyes of His Contemporaries,'. In: Albert Blankert, et al. (eds.): Rembrandt: A Genius and His Impact [Exhibition Catalogue National Gallery of Victoria]. (Zwolle: Waanders, 1997), pp. 58–68
- Van de Wetering, Ernst (1999), 'The Multiple Functions of Rembrandt's Self Portraits,'. In: Rembrandt by Himself, edited by Christopher White and Quentin Buvelot. (London: National Gallery Publications, 1999), pp. 8–37
- Van de Wetering, Ernst (2001), 'Delimiting Rembrandt's Autograph Oeuvre – an Insoluble Problem,'. In: The Mystery of the Young Rembrandt, edited by Ernst van de Wetering and Bernhard Schnackenburg. [Exh. cat. Kassel, Staatliche Museen Kassel, Gemäldegalerie Alte Meister, Schloss Wilhelmshöhe; Amsterdam: Museum Het Rembrandthuis]. (Wolfratshausen, 2001), pp. 58–81
- Van de Wetering, Ernst (2001), 'Rembrandt's Beginnings: An Essay,'. In: Ernst van de Wetering, Bernhard Schnackenburg, et al., The Mystery of the Young Rembrandt. (Amsterdam: Museum Het Rembrandthuis, 2001), pp. 22–57
- Van de Wetering, Ernst (2001), 'Thirty Years of the Rembrandt Research Project: The Tension Between Science and Connoisseurship in Authenticating Art,'. IFAR Journal 4(2): 14–26
- Van de Wetering, Ernst (2005), 'Rembrandt's Self-Portraits: Problems of Authenticity and Function,'. In: Ernst van de Wetering et al., A Corpus of Rembrandt Paintings IV: The Self-Portraits. (Dordrecht: Springer, 2005), pp. 89–317
- Van de Wetering, Ernst (2006), 'Rembrandt's Oil Studies: New Light on an Old Problem,'. In: Rembrandt: Quest of a Genius. (Amsterdam: Rembrandthuis; Zwolle: Waanders, 2006), pp. 179–209
- Van de Wetering, Ernst (2006), 'Rembrandt as a Searching Artist,'. In: Ernst van de Wetering, et al., Rembrandt: Quest of a Genius. (Amsterdam: Museum Het Rembrandthuis, 2006), pp. 79–124
- Van de Wetering, Ernst (2008), 'Connoisseurship and Rembrandt's Paintings: New Directions in the Rembrandt Research Project, Part II,'. The Burlington Magazine 150(1259): 83–90
- Van de Wetering, Ernst (2008), 'The Various Functions of Rembrandt's Self-Portraits,'. In: B. Leca et al., Rembrandt: Three Faces of the Master [exhib. cat.]. (Cincinnati: Cincinnati Art Museum, 2008), pp. 51–71
- Van de Wetering, Ernst (2011), 'More than one hand in paintings by Rembrandt,'. In: Ernst Van De Wetering, et al. (eds.): A Corpus of Rembrandt Paintings, Vol. V: The Small-Scale History Paintings. (Dordrecht: Springer, 2011), pp. 311–321
- Van de Wetering, Ernst (2011), 'Towards a Reconstruction of Rembrandt's Art Theory,'. In: Ernst Van De Wetering, et al. (eds.): A Corpus of Rembrandt Paintings, Vol. V: The Small-Scale History Paintings. (Dordrecht: Springer, 2011), pp. 3–140
- Van de Wetering, Ernst (2014), 'The Leiden Period (1624–1631). Rembrandt's research of the gronden,'. In: A Corpus of Rembrandt Paintings VI. Stichting Foundation Rembrandt Research Project, vol 6. (Dordrecht: Springer, 2014), pp. 68–117
- Van Eeghen, H. (1956), 'Rembrandt's Claudius Civilis and the funeral ticket,'. Konsthistorisk Tidskrift 25(1–4): 55–57. doi:10.1080/00233605608603568
- Van Emde Boas, Conrad (1971), 'Rembrandt als erotischer Künstler,'. Zeitschrift für Psychosomatische Medizin und Psychoanalyse 17(2): 187–193. JSTOR 23995679 [in German]
- Van Hoogstraten, Samuel (1672), 'Inleyding tot de Hooge Schoole der Schilderkonst' (Amsterdam, 1672). Translated for the Art Humanities Primary Source Reader by Benjamin Binstock.
- Van Regteren Altena, J. Q. (1967), 'The Origin of a Motif in Rembrandt's Work,'. Master Drawings 5(4): 375–378
- Van Schendel, A. (1956), 'Notes on the Support of Rembrandt's 'Claudius Civilis','. Konsthistorisk Tidskrift 25(1/4): 38–42. doi:10.1080/00233605608603566
- Van Straten, Roelof (1992), 'Early Works by Lievens and Rembrandt in Two Unknown Still Lifes,'. Artibus et Historiae 13(26): 121–142. JSTOR 1483435
- Van Straten, Roelof (2002), 'Rembrandt's "Earliest Prints" Reconsidered,'. Artibus et Historiae 23(45): 167–177. JSTOR 1483686
- Vermeulen, Ingrid R. (2009), 'Michel de Marolles's album of Rembrandt prints and the reception of Dutch art in France,'. Simiolus: Netherlands Quarterly for the History of Art 34 (3/4): 155–182
- Versteegh, Matthijs (2009), 'Sociology and Science. A Short Controversy Study About Rembrandt's Painting,'. Krisis: Journal for Contemporary Philosophy 1: 46–55
- Wadum, Jørgen; Rønberg, Lene Bøgh (2006), 'Two Paintings in Copenhagen Re-Attributed to Rembrandt,'. The Burlington Magazine 148(1235): 82–88
- Waiboer, Adriaan E. (2013), 'Willem de Poorter: Rembrandt/Not Rembrandt Pupil,'. JHNA: Journal of Historians of Netherlandish Art 5(2). doi:10.5092/jhna.2013.5.2.12
- Wasserman, Burton (1970), 'Rembrandt: A Legacy of Eloquence,'. Art Education 23(3): 19–23. doi:10.1080/00043125.1970.11653842
- Weber, Gregor J. M. (2017), 'Rembrandt in Kassel: The Relativity of Eighteenth-Century Connoisseurship,'. Kyoto Studies in Art History 2: 73–82. doi:10.14989/229461
- Weisz, George M.; Albury, William R. (2013), 'Rembrandt's Jewish Physician—Dr Ephraim Bueno (1599–1665): A Brief Medical History,'. Rambam Maimonides Medical Journal 4(2): e0010. doi:10.5041/RMMJ.10110
- Weisz, George M.; Albury, William R. (2015), 'Diseases of Old Age in Two Paintings by Rembrandt,'. Rambam Maimonides Medical Journal 6(4): e0042. doi:10.5041/RMMJ.10227
- Wertheim, David J. (2010), 'The Symbolic Meaning of a Presumed Relationship: Rembrandt and Spinoza in German Literature, 1890–1934,'. In: Martin Bollacher, Thomas Kisser und Manfred Walther (Hrsg.), Ein neuer Blick auf die Welt: Spinoza in Literatur, Kunst und Ästhetik [Schriftenreihe der Spinoza-Gesellschaft Bd. 14]. (Würzburg: Königshausen & Neumann, 2010), pp. 73–81
- Westermann, Mariët (2011), 'Back to Basics: Rembrandt and the Emergence of Modern Painting,'. Perspective: la revue de l'INHA 4 (2011–12): 723–47
- Weststeijn, Thijs (2005), 'Rembrandt and Rhetoric. The Concepts of affectus, enargeia and ornatus in Samuel van Hoogstraten's Judgement of His Master,'. In: The Learned Eye: Regarding art, theory and the artist's reputation, edited by Natasja van Eck, Marieke van den Doel, Gerbrand Korevaar, Anna Tummers and Thijs Weststenijn. (Amsterdam: Amsterdam University Press, 2005), pp. 111–30
- Weststeijn, Thijs (2013), '"Passie, Hartstocht": Painting and Evoking Emotions in Rembrandt's Studio,'. In: Ad Fontes: Niederlandische Kunst des 17. Jahrhunderts in Quellen, edited by Claudia Fritzsche, Karin Leonhard and Gregor Weber. (Petersberg: Michael Imhof Verlag, 2013), pp. 305–30
- Weststeijn, Thijs (2016), 'The Sublime and the "Beholder's Share": Junius, Rubens, Rembrandt,'. JHNA: Journal of Historians of Netherlandish Art 8(2). doi:10.5092/jhna.2016.8.2.2
- White, Howard (1974), 'Rembrandt and the Human Condition,'. Interpretation: A Journal of Political Philosophy 4(1): 17–37
- White, Raymond; Kirby, Jo (1994), 'Rembrandt and his Circle: Seventeenth-Century Dutch Paint Media Re-examined,'. National Gallery Technical Bulletin 15: 64–78
- Wischnitzer, Rachel (1957), 'Rembrandt, Callot, and Tobias Stimmer,'. The Art Bulletin 39(3): 224–230
- Wiser, Itay; Parnass, Adam J.; Rachmiel, Ronny; Westreich, Melvyn; Friedman, Tali (2016), 'Rembrandt's Ocular Pathologies,'. Ophthalmic Plastic and Reconstructive Surgery 32(4): 305–309
- Wright, J. Lenore (2007), 'Reading Rembrandt: The Influence of Cartesian Dualism on Dutch Art,'. History of European Ideas 33(3): 275–291. doi:10.1016/j.histeuroideas.2006.11.012
- Yanisky-Ravid, Shlomit (2017), 'Generating Rembrandt: Artificial Intelligence, Copyright, and Accountability in the 3A Era—The Human-Like Authors are Already Here—A New Model,'. Michigan State Law Review 659[2017]
- Zell, Michael (2000), 'Encountering Difference: Rembrandt's Presentation in the Dark Manner,'. Art History 23(4): 496–521
- Zell, Michael (2003), 'A Leisurely and Virtuous Pursuit: Amateur Artists, Rembrandt, and Landscape Representationin Seventeenth-Century Holland,'. Nederlands Kunsthistorisch Jaarboek 54: 337–373
- Zell, Michael (2008), 'Eduard Kolloff and the Historiographic Romance of Rembrandt and the Jews,'. Simiolus: Netherlands Quarterly for the History of Art 28: 181–97
- Zell, Michael (2011), 'Rembrandt's Gifts: A Case Study of Actor-Network-Theory,'. JHNA: Journal of Historians of Netherlandish Art 3(2). doi:10.5092/jhna.2011.3.2.2
- Zielonka, Anthony (2008), Eugène Fromentin and Rembrandt's Painterly Language of Light,'. Romance Quarterly 55(3): 231–240. doi:10.3200/RQTR.55.3.231-240
- Ziemba, Antoni (2008), 'Nowa wizja osobowosci i tworczosci Rembrandta: dwie wystawy roku rembrandtowskiego (i jeden obraz polski),' [A New Vision of Rembrandt's Personality and Creativity: Two Exhibitions of the Rembrandt Year (and One Polish Picture)]. Rocznik Historii Sztuki 33: 29–44. [in Polish]
- Zimmerman, E. (1991), 'Rembrandt to Rembrandt: A case study of a memorable painting teacher of artistically talented 13 to 16 year‐old students,'. Roeper Review 13(2): 76–81. doi:10.1080/02783199109553315
- Zlotnick, A. (1998), 'Rembrandt's self-portrait,'. The Lancet 351(9106): 915. doi:10.1016/S0140-6736(05)70337-8
- Żygulski, Zdzisław (2000), 'Further Battles for the "Lisowczyk" (Polish Rider) by Rembrandt,'. Artibus et Historiae 21(41): 197–205. doi:10.2307/1483642

== Literary works (e.g. poetry and fiction) ==
- Balm, Alfred: The Fake Rembrandt. (2017) ISBN 9781532020995
- Berg, Janet Lee: Rembrandt's Shadow. (New York, NY: Post Hill Press, 2016) ISBN 978-1682611432
- Bertrand, Aloysius: Gaspard de la Nuit - Fantaisies à la manière de Rembrandt et de Callot [Gaspard of the Night - Fantasies in the Manner of Rembrandt and Callot] (1842) [in French]
- Christopher, Paul: Rembrandt's Ghost [A Finn Ryan Novel, 3]. (Berkley, 2007) ISBN 978-0451221759
- Connor, Alexandra: The Rembrandt Secret. (London: Quercus Publishing, 2011) ISBN 978-1849163460
- Connor, Alexandra: The Other Rembrandt. (New York: SilverOak, 2011)
- Cullen, Lynn: I Am Rembrandt's Daughter. (New York: Bloomsbury, 2007)
- De Vries, Theun: Rembrandt. (Amsterdam, 1931)
- Devereux, Kim: Rembrandt's Mirror. (London: Atlantic Books, 2015)
- Johnston, Michael: Rembrandt Sings: A Tale of Forgery, Deceit, Sex And, Quite Possibly, Murder. (United Kingdom: Akanos, 2012)
- Kastner, Jörg: Het blauw van Rembrandt. (Uithoorn: Karakter Uitgevers B.V., 2019) ISBN 9789045215990 [in Dutch]
- Katz, Monroe: Sparring with Rembrandt. (Silverado Books, 2010) ISBN 9780981742533
- Koot, Raymond (a.k.a. Typex): Rembrandt. (London: SelfMadeHero, 2013)
- Lermontov, Mikhail: To the Picture of Rembrandt (poem, 1830) [in Russian]
- Matton, Sylvie: Moi, la Putain de Rembrandt. (Paris: Plon, 1998) [in French]
- Matton, Sylvie: Ik, Hendrickje Stoffels: Het leven van de minnares van Rembrandt. [Vertaling: Nini Wielink]. (Amsterdam: Arena, 1999) [in Dutch]
- Matton, Sylvie: Rembrandt's Whore. Translated from the French by Tamsin Black. (New York: Canongate, 2003)
- McEntyre, Marilyn Chandler: Drawn to the Light: Poems on Rembrandt's Religious Paintings. (Grand rapids, Michigan: Wm.B. Eerdmans Publishing, 2004)
- Miano, Sarah Emily: Van Rijn. (London: Picador, 2006)
- Miano, Sarah Emily: Van Rijn. Biografische roman. [Vertaling: Sjaak de Jong & Marijke Versluys]. (Amsterdam: De Bezige Bij, 2006) [in Dutch]
- Moore, Steven M.: Rembrandt's Angel. (Penmore Press, 2017) ISBN 978-1946409027
- Padel, Ruth: Rembrandt Would Have Loved You [Chatto Poetry]. (London: Chatto & Windus, 1998) ISBN 0701167157
- Schmitt, Gladys: Rembrandt. (New York: Random House, 1961)
- Siegal, Nina: The Anatomy Lesson. (New York: Doubleday, 2014)
- Silva, Daniel: The Rembrandt Affair. (New York, NY: Berkley Books, 2011) ISBN 978-0451233998
- Ternar, Yeshim: Rembrandt's Model. (Montreal: Véhicule Press, 1998)
- Warner, Francis: Rembrandt's Mirror [Oxford Theatre Texts, 14]. (Colin Smythe Limited, 2000) ISBN 9780861404322
- Weiss, David: I, Rembrandt. (New York: St. Martin's Press, 1979)
- Wharton, Edith: The Rembrandt, in Crucial Instances (short story collection, 1901)
- Zuckmayer, Carl: Rembrandt. Ein Film. (Frankfurt am Main: Fischer Taschenbuch Verlag, 1980) [in German]

== Films ==
- The Stolen Rembrandt (1914 film directed by Leo D. Maloney and J.P. McGowan)
- Die Tragödie eines Großen [The Tragedy of a Great Man] (1920 film directed by Arthur Günsburg)
- The Missing Rembrandt (1932 film directed by Leslie S. Hiscott)
- Rembrandt (1936 film directed by Alexander Korda)
- Rembrandt (1940 film)
- Rembrandt (1942 film directed by Hans Steinhoff)
- Rembrandt in de schuilkelder [Rembrandt in the Bunker] (1941 film directed by Gerard Rutten)
- Rembrandt, schilder van de mens [Rembrandt, Painter of Man] (1957 film directed by Bert Haanstra)
- Rembrandt fecit 1669 (1977 film directed by Jos Stelling)
- Rembrandt (1999 film directed by Charles Matton)
- Rembrandt: Fathers & Sons (1999 film directed by David Devine)
- Stealing Rembrandt (2003 film directed by Jannik Johansen and Anders Thomas Jensen)
- Nightwatching (2007 film directed by Peter Greenaway)
- Rembrandt en ik (2011 film directed by Marleen Gorris)

== Documentaries ==
- Rembrandt: A Self-Portrait (1954 documentary film by Morrie Roizman)
- Rembrandt: The Public Eye and the Private Gaze (Simon Schama, BBC, 1992)
- Simon Schama's Power of Art: Rembrandt (2006 BBC documentary film series by Simon Schama)
- Rembrandt's J'Accuse (2008 documentary film by Peter Greenaway)
- Schama on Rembrandt: Masterpieces of the Late Years (2014 documentary film by Simon Schama)
- Rembrandt: From the National Gallery, London and Rijksmuseum, Amsterdam (2014 documentary film by Kat Mansoor)

== Lectures and conferences ==
- Rembrandt – Wissenschaft auf der Suche [Rembrandt – The Quest of Scholarship]. Beiträge des Internationalen Symposiums Berlin: 4. und 5. November 2006
- Learning and Teaching with Rembrandt: Cross-Disciplinary Approaches to the Master Etcher [Symposium]. (Herbert F. Johnson Museum of Art, Cornell University, 28 October 2017)
- Rembrandt et nous, André Malraux (Stockholm: National Museum of Stockholm, 1956) [in French]
- Le visage dans l'œuvre gravé de Rembrandt, Claude-Jean Darmon, Académie des beaux-arts, conférence prononcée le 17 avril 2013 [in French]
- Walter W. S. Cook Annual Lecture: Hercules Segers and Rembrandt, the Eccentric and the Traditionalist, Nadine Orenstein (New York University Institute of Fine Arts, 26 April 2017)

== Visual arts ==
- Rembrandtplein
- Kantor, Tadeusz: Lekcja anatomii wedle Rembrandta [The Anatomy Lesson according to Rembrandt]. (Galerii Foksal, Warsaw, 1969)

== See also ==
- Cultural depictions of Rembrandt
- List of drawings by Rembrandt
- List of etchings by Rembrandt
- List of paintings by Rembrandt
- List of self-portraits by Rembrandt
- List of Rembrandt pupils
- List of Rembrandt connoisseurs and scholars
- List of things named after Rembrandt van Rijn
