= Katzenellenbogen =

Katzenellenbogen is an Ashkenazi surname derived from the name of the former County of Katzenelnbogen, a powerful medieval state of the German Empire (see also Katzenelnbogen Castle and town). Protection money paid by the Ashkenazi was a source of income for the principality. Different spellings of the toponym and surname include Katzenelenbogen and Katznelbogen, with further derivative forms and spellings of the surname like Katsenelenbogen, Catzenellenbogen, Katzin, Katz, Elbogen/Ellenbogen and Bogen.

== Notable people ==
- Aharon Katzenellenbogen (born 1893), co-founders of the Neturei Karta sect
- Benita Katzenellenbogen (born 1945), American biologist
- Boris D. Bogen (1869–1929), born Katzenelenbogen, Russian-born Jewish-American educator and social worker
- Edwin Katzen-Ellenbogen or Katzenellenbogen (1882–after 1955), Austrian-Polish and American eugenicist and physician; Nazi collaborator in Buchenwald concentration camp
- Eyran Katsenelenbogen (born 1965), Israeli-born American jazz pianist
- Ezekiel Katzenellenbogen (about 1670–1749), Polish-German rabbi
- Gershon Ellenbogen (1917–2003), British barrister, author and Liberal Party politician (born Katzenellenbogen)
- John Katzenellenbogen (born 1944), Americanchemist
- Konrad Kellen (1913–2007), German-born American political scientist, intelligence analyst and author (born Katzenellenbogen)
- Stephen M. Kellen (1914-2004), German-born investment banker (born Katzenellenbogen)
- Ludwig Katzenellenbogen (1877–1944), German brewery director
- Meir ben Isaac Katzenellenbogen (died 1565), Italian rabbi
- Ostap Ortwin (1876–1942), whose real name was Oskar Katzenellenbogen, Polish journalist and literary critic
- Samuel Judah Katzenellenbogen, Italian rabbi, son of Meir
- Tamara Katsenelenbogen (1894–1976), Russian architect

== In popular culture ==
- "Gilly Gilly Ossenfeffer Katzenellen Bogen by the Sea", a 1954 popular song by Al Hoffman and Dick Manning
- a fictional family in the short story "The Spectre Bridegroom" in Washington Irving's 1819 collection The Sketch Book of Geoffrey Crayon, Gent.
- a fictional character in part 3 of Vasily Grossman's 1960 novel Life and Fate
- Yakov Katzenelenbogen, the fictional leader of the eponymous team in the Phoenix Force novels
- Yiddish writer Chaim Grade's novel Sons and Daughters follows a family with the surname Katzenellenbogen

== "Son of" (Katznelson) ==
Katzeneleson, Kazenelson, Kaznelson are further variations of the name by addition of the ending -son, 'son (of)'.

== See also ==
- Bogen (surname)
- Elbogen/Ellenbogen (surname)
- Katz (surname)
- Katzin (surname)
  - Lee H. Katzin (1935–2002), US film director
  - Mirjam Katzin (b. 1986), Swedish academic and lawyer
  - Olga Katzin Miller (1896–1987), British satirical poet who published under the name Sagittarius
