= Portrait of a Young Man with a Golden Chain =

1635 painting attributed to Rembrandt

Portrait of a Young Man With a Golden Chain (Self-Portrait with a new beard)
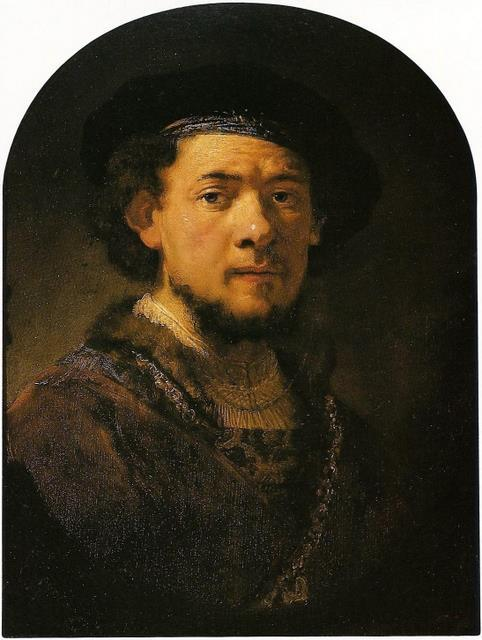
- Artist: Rembrandt
- Year: 1635
- Type: Oil on wood
- Dimensions: 57 cm × 44 cm (22 in × 17 in)
- Location: São Paulo Museum of Art, São Paulo

Portrait of a Young Man with a Gold Chain is an oil painting usually attributed to the Dutch painter Rembrandt. Signed and dated 1635, it was traditionally regarded as a self-portrait (under the title Self-Portrait with Beard Rising or Self-Portrait with a Gold Chain), although contemporary criticism tends to challenge this hypothesis.

The accreditation of this work to Rembrandt is supported by various documents and graphic records dating to the seventeenth century. However, a report by the Rembrandt Research Project in 1989 assigned it to the "circle" of the Dutch master. This new assignment was controversial: the opinion was challenged by Pietro Maria Bardi and Luiz Marques, among other experts, who credit the authorship of the painting to Rembrandt. The work is currently preserved at the São Paulo Museum of Art.

== The painting ==
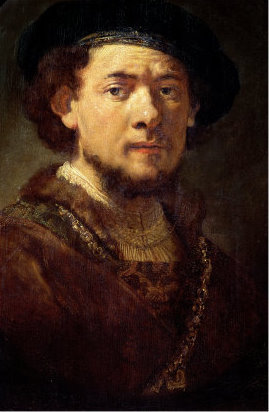
Detail of the painting.

The young man with the golden chain stares directly towards the viewer, suggesting a certain reserve and a distant melancholy by his facial expression. The character is a careful hard worker, standing out against the neutral background, with variations of lighting on the same shade of the single colour. Around his neck, there is a golden chain the shape of a V which then hangs down his chest. The sitter has accessories, a back cap and a heavy woven shawl.

The format of the work is unusual. The existence of copies suggests the portrait was originally a rectangular shape and had slightly larger dimensions. The work is currently in a poor condition with some original pictorial material overlapping in certain places. On his right shoulder, readable only under infrared light, is the signature "Rembrandt".

=== Portrait or self-portrait? ===
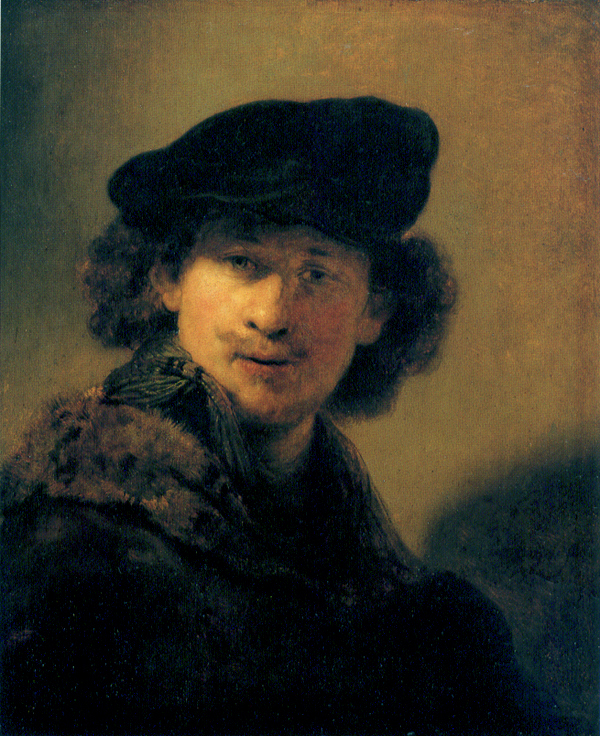
Rembrandt. Self-Portrait, 1634. Gemäldegalerie, Berlin.

As old as the accreditation to Rembrandt is the belief that the work would have been a self-portrait completed around 1635. From the second half of the 20th century, many historians have challenged this hypothesis, based on other self-portraits painted in the same period.

Kurt Bauch is the first. In 1966, the German historian questioned the traditional identification of the portrait, preferring to name the work with a generic title of Junger Mann in Reicher Tracht ("The young in rich costumes"). Two years later, Horst Gerson supported Bauch's doubts, followed by Paolo Lecaldano (1969) and Christopher Wright (1981).

In 1989, the belief from the Rembrandt Research Project did not only disagree with the hypothesis of the work being a self-portrait, but denies the Rembrandt accreditation. Luiz Marques differs from this belief which refers to the authorship, but considers the traditional hypothesis that it is "extremely unlikely" a self-portrait, adding that a comparison between this portrait in the São Paulo Museum of Art and two self-portraits from the 1630s, in the Louvre and in the Gemäldegalerie, reveal that the similarities are basically characteristic of portraits of that time period.

== Accreditation ==
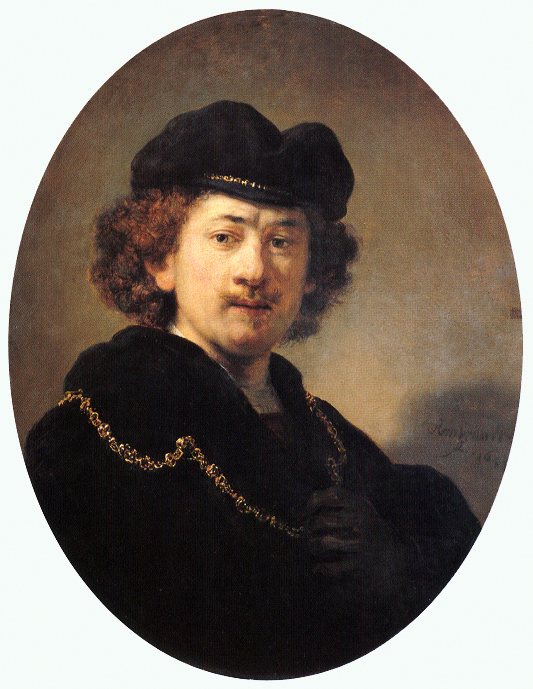
Rembrandt. Self-portrait Wearing a Toque and a Gold Chain, 1633. Louvre Museum, Paris

The first registration documenting the work and the authorship of Rembrandt dates back to the 17th century. The portrait in São Paulo Museum of Art was reproduced in a work by Ferdinand Bol, a direct student of Rembrandt. At least three eighteenth century prints of the work were also produced: one from Pieter van Bleek, another from Murray and a third from Johann Georg Hertel II. All three bear the inscription "Rembrandt pinxit" ("Rembrandt painted it"). In the historiography, the portrait appears in biographies, compilations and catalogues of Rembrandt paintings since at least 1822. There are many references to the canvas as being one of the painter's masterpieces (John Smith, 1836; Carel Vosmaer, 1877, amongst others), also it is certified by a considerable number of old copies and depictions produced by other renowned artists such as William Hogarth.

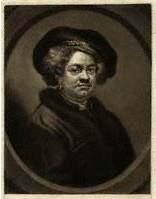
James Macardell. John Pine. painting done from the portrait by William Hogarth

In 1968, Gerson noted that the accreditation to Rembrandt "is not totally convincing" and in 1983 Werner Sumowski put forward the name Govaert Flinck as a possible painter of the portrait. But it was only in 1989 that an opinion contradictory to the traditional accreditation was formed. In that year, the work was analysed by a member of the Rembrandt Research Project, a committee of specialists based in the Netherlands, to determine the authenticity of all the known paintings of Rembrandt. The commission's judgement was to deny the accreditation to the Dutch master, attributing the work instead to the "Rembrandt circle".

A polemic discussion was established. In the same year, the historian Pietro Maria Bardi declared his disagreement with the commission's decision. Three years later, he restated his belief that the portrait "is a masterpiece", pointing out that many "foreign museums refuse to believe the Commissions verdict". In fact, institutions such as the Frick Collection of New York City, and specialists such as Simon Schama have rejected the committee's decision and the Rembrandt Research Project have revised many of their accreditations (in 2005, four paintings attributed to the "Rembrandt circle" were republished by the commission as Rembrandt's autographic works).

In 1998, Luiz Marques, Professor of Art History at Unicamp, also disagreed with the commission's judgement, listing a series of elements disregarded in the analysis by the Project that, in his opinion, "distances the work from the radius of the Rembrandt action". Marques even observed that scientific examination is necessary to obtain a more specific analysis surrounding the accreditation of the portrait, and the true authenticity of the signature – ignored by the Project -, remembering that the prestige that the portrait enjoyed in the past also is a strong indication of its origin, at least in the Rembrandt studio.

Besides the above, the work was attributed to Rembrandt with more or less conviction by Cornelis Hofstede de Groot, Abraham Bredius, Hendrik Enno van Gelder, Egbert Haverkamp-Begemann and Christopher Brown amongst others, and by all the specialised critics prior to the 20th century, with the exception of Gustav Friedrich Waagen.

== Other versions and depictions ==
Besides the pictures already mentioned, the painting in São Paulo Museum of Art served as inspiration for the 1755 Portrait of John Pine, by the English sculptor and painter William Hogarth, currently kept in the Beaverbrook Art Gallery in Fredericton, Canada. The information was given by the Museum curator in a letter sent to Pietro Maria Bardi, dated 1985.

There are various copies of the portrait. Christopher Wright emphasised one in particular that was different from the others as it possessed a higher level of quality compared to the painting in São Paulo Museum of Art and had some variations in how the garments were portrayed. The work was in the Amsterdam art market in the 1960s, but its current location is unknown.

There is also a record of a composition by Ferdinand Bol, a talented pupil of Rembrandt, which faithfully reproduces the work in the São Paulo Museum of Art. Ferdinand Bol often went to the Rembrandt studio between 1635 and 1637 – the same period as that in which the Portrait of a Young Man with a Gold Chain is usually dated- which, according to Luiz Marques, would show that the painting was at least in the Rembrandt studio.

== See also ==
- Self-portraits by Rembrandt
- List of paintings by Rembrandt
- Baroque painting
- Dutch Golden Age

== Bibliography ==
- Historia de Museu de Arte de São Paulo, Bardi, Pietro Maria, Instituto Quadrante, São Paulo, 1992 23-29 p.
- Catálogo do Museu de Arte de São Paulo Assis Chateaubriand , Marques, Luiz, A. Besolí, Arte da Península Ibérica, São Paulo, Prêmio, 1988, 113-117 p.
