= Double Portrait of an Old Man and an Old Woman =

Two 1654 paintings by Rembrandt

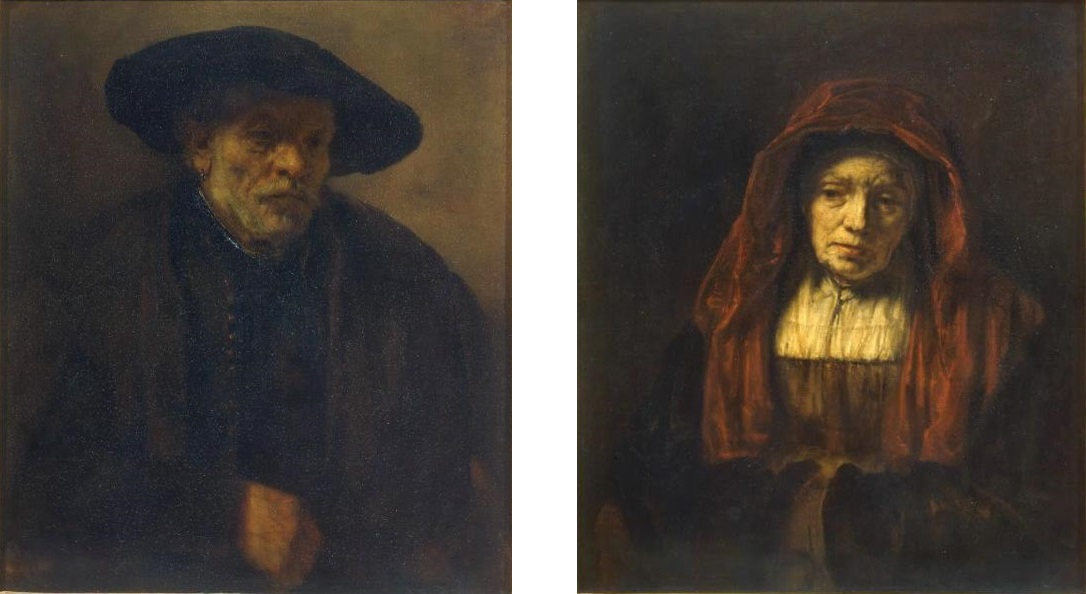

Pendant Portraits of an Old Man and an Old Woman refers to two 1654 oil on canvas pendant portraits by Rembrandt, Portrait of an Old Man and Portrait of an Old Woman, usually identified as a single pair. Signed and dated by the artist, both works were in the collection of Heinrich von Brühl, whose heirs sold them to Catherine II of Russia in 1769. They are both now in the Pushkin Museum in Moscow, to which they were transferred from the Hermitage Museum in 1930.

Their subjects are unknown, though are traditionally held to be Rembrandt's brother Adriaen van Rijn and Adriaen's wife Lijsbeth van Leeuwen. That identification was thrown into doubt in 1916 by Cornelis Hofstede de Groot, though he still held that the works formed a pair, as did Kurt Bauch and Christian Tümpel. Tümpel additionally argues that the old woman represents a Biblical figure. The only art historian to argue that they do not belong together was Leonard J. Slatkes.

== Sources ==
- http://www.arts-museum.ru/data/fonds/europe_and_america/j/0000_1000/2291_Portret_starika/index.php
- http://www.arts-museum.ru/data/fonds/europe_and_america/j/0000_1000/2292_Portret_starushki/index.php
