= List of Rembrandt connoisseurs and scholars =

Rembrandt Harmenszoon van Rijn in one of the most researched (visual) artists in history. His life and work have long attracted the attention of multidisciplinary scholarship. The field of Rembrandt studies (i.e. study of Rembrandt's life and work)—as an academic field in its own right with many noted Rembrandt scholars—has been very dynamic and well published since the Dutch Golden Age.

The following is a list of notable Rembrandt experts (e.g. connoisseurs and scholars):

- Filippo Baldinucci
- Adam Bartsch
- Kurt Bauch
- Otto Benesch
- Harry Berger, Jr.
- Holm Bevers
- Jan Białostocki
- Michael Bockemühl
- Wilhelm von Bode
- Pascal Bonafoux
- Abraham Bredius
- B.P.J. Broos
- Josua Bruyn
- Margaret D. Carroll
- H. Perry Chapman
- Kenneth Clark
- Paul Crenshaw
- Marieke de Winkel
- Stephanie S. Dickey
- Eugène Dutuit
- Edme-François Gersaint
- Zhenya Gershman
- Horst Gerson
- Amy Golahny
- Cornelis Hofstede de Groot
- Bob Haak
- Egbert Haverkamp-Begemann
- Julius S. Held
- Arthur Mayger Hind
- Erik Hinterding
- Arnold Houbraken
- Constantijn Huygens
- Thomas Kaplan
- Nigel Konstam
- Gerard de Lairesse
- Arthur Pillans Laurie
- Frits Lugt
- François Émile Michel
- Nadler, Steven
- Perlove, Shelley
- Jakob Rosenberg
- Albert Rothenberg
- Martin Royalton-Kisch
- Joachim von Sandrart
- Catherine B. Scallen
- Simon Schama
- Peter Schatborn
- James A. Schirillo
- Gary Schwartz
- Woldemar von Seidlitz
- Larry Silver
- Seymour Slive
- Eric Jan Sluijter
- Werner Sumowski
- Christian Tümpel
- Wilhelm Valentiner
- Gregor J. M. Weber
- Ernst van de Wetering
- Samuel van Hoogstraten
- Arthur K. Wheelock Jr.
- Christopher White
- Michael Zell

== See also ==
- List of Rembrandt pupils
- List of works about Rembrandt
- Rembrandt Research Project
