= Gary Schwartz (art historian) =

American art historian

- Born: June 12, 1940 (age 86); Brooklyn, New York, United States
- Occupation: Art historian
- Spouse: Loekie Hendriks (m. 1968)
- Children: 2 (Ditke and Baruch)

Academic background
- Education: New York University; Johns Hopkins University (did not graduate)
- Doctoral advisor: Adolf Katzenellenbogen
- Influences: Egbert Haverkamp-Begemann; H. W. Janson; Jan Gerrit van Gelder; Horst Gerson

Academic work
- Discipline: Art history
- Sub-discipline: Dutch Golden Age
- Website: http://www.garyschwartzarthistorian.nl/

Gary Schwartz (born June 12, 1940, in Brooklyn) is an American-born Dutch art historian, who is a scholar of Rembrandt and art of the Dutch Golden Age.

== Career ==
A native of East New York, Brooklyn, Schwartz was born to Hungarian mother and a Polish American father, who worked in textile manufacturing. He then moved with his family to Far Rockaway, Queens, at the age of twelve. In 1961, Schwartz received a Bachelor of Arts in Art History from New York University, where he was inspired to study the topic after taking an introductory course by the noted art historian H. W. Janson. Schwartz then continued to Johns Hopkins University, where he completed coursework towards a Doctor of Philosophy in Art History, focusing on medieval art. In 1965, Schwartz moved to the Netherlands to research Dutch Golden Age painting, never to return to the United States and abandoned completing his doctoral degree.

In 1966, Schwartz took up various jobs, including as a translator of Dutch and German texts, an assistant to Jan Gerrit van Gelder at Utrecht University, and editor of the journal Simiolus. Two years later, Schwartz also worked under Horst Gerson editing publications, and married Loekie Hendriks. In 1971, Schwartz established his own publishing firm called "Uitgeverij Gary Schwartz" in Maarssen, in order to print books that were considered important to the field of art from the Dutch Golden Age. Six years later, Schwartz published his first book, which was on the artist Rembrandt, titled Rembrandt: All the Etchings Reproduced in True Size.

Schwartz continued research on Rembrandt, publishing several more books over the years and establishing himself as an expert on the artist. From 1986 to 1987, Schwartz conducted research at the Getty Center, and a year later, sold his publishing firm. However, he continued to work for the company until 1991.

In 1998, Schwartz founded CODART, a digital network for curators of art from the Low Countries. He served as its director until 2005, but continued to work for the network until 2008.

In 2009, Schwartz received the Prins Bernhard Cultuurfonds Prize for the Humanities, a lifetime achievement award.

== Select works ==
- Rembrandt: All the Etchings Reproduced in True Size (1977)
- Rembrandt: Zijn Leven, Zijn Schilderijen (1984)
- Rembrandt: His Life, His Paintings (1985) ISBN 9780670808762
- Rembrandt (1992) ISBN 9780810937604
- The Complete Etchings of Rembrandt (1994) ISBN 9780486281810
- Bets and Scams: A Novel of the Art World (1996) ISBN 9780714530086
- The Night Watch (2002) ISBN 9789040095559
- The Rembrandt Book (2006) ISBN 9780810943179
- Rembrandt's Universe: His Art, His Life, His World (2006) ISBN 9780500093313
- Meet Rembrandt: Life and Work of the Master Painter (2011) ISBN 9789086890576
- Emotions: Pain and Pleasure in Dutch Painting of the Golden Age (2014) ISBN 9789462081703

== See also ==
- List of New York University alumni
- List of people from Brooklyn
- List of Rembrandt connoisseurs and scholars
