= John Michael Montias =

American art historian

- Born: October 3, 1928; Paris, France
- Died: July 26, 2005 (aged 76); Branford, Connecticut, United States
- Burial place: Grove Street Cemetery
- Occupations: Economist; Art historian
- Spouse: Marie
- Children: 1 (John Luke)

Academic background
- Education: Columbia University
- Thesis: Producers' Prices in a Centralized Economy: The Polish Experience (1958)
- Influences: Egbert Haverkamp-Begemann

Academic work
- Discipline: Economics; Art history
- Sub-discipline: Soviet economics Dutch Golden Age painting
- Institutions: Yale University

John Michael Montias (3 October 1928 – 26 July 2005) was a French-born American economist and art historian, known for his contributions to cultural economics, particularly related to Dutch Golden Age painting. Montias was part of the Annales School of historians. He was Professor of Economics Emeritus at Yale University.

== Career ==
Born in Paris to Jewish parents, Montias was sent alone to the United States at a young age in 1940, in order to escape the Battle of France during World War II. He settled in Buffalo, New York, and attended the Nichols School there. He is known to have volunteered at the Albright–Knox Art Gallery around that time.

Montias studied at Columbia University, where he received a Bachelor of Arts in 1947, a Master of Arts in 1950, and Doctor of Philosophy in Economics in 1958. He focused particularly on economics in the Soviet bloc.

In the same year as graduation, Montias began teaching at Yale University as an Assistant Professor of Economics, and published studies on Polish and Romanian economics. In 1961, Montias received a Guggenheim Fellowship in Economics. Two years later, he was promoted to Associate Professor and then to Professor in the following year. From 1966 to 1969 and then 1982 to 1984, he served as the Department Chair of Graduate Studies. Upon retirement, Montias was given the title of Professor of Economics Emeritus.

In the mid-1970s, Montias' interest shifted to cultural economics, particularly that of art in seventeenth-century Netherlands, a subject that had been of interest since graduate school. His first article on the subject, "Painters in Delft, 1613–1680," was published in the 1978–1979 volume of Simiolus, and is credited with helping invigorate the study of the economics of art. This line of research culminated in a book titled Artists and Artisans in Delft: A Socio-Economic Study of the Seventeenth Century in 1982. The book demonstrates how economic history may contribute to a better understanding of cultural developments.

In the early 1980s, Montias began recording details of ownership of works of art from the Amsterdam City Archives, as part of work on the prices of Dutch paintings at auctions in Amsterdam in the seventeenth century. In 1986, he was given a grant by the Getty Research Institute to work on the topic. Montias was one of the earliest contributors to the Getty's Provenance Index, which had been established only a few years earlier. After leaving the Getty, he continued inputting the material on his own and added significant data, all of which was eventually given to the Frick Art Reference Library.

Montias's contributions to the studies of the painter Johannes Vermeer have been widely acknowledged. In 1989, Montias published Vermeer and His Milieu, in which he mentions many new documents on Pieter van Ruijven and other principal collectors of Vermeer paintings. Montias concentrated on Maria Thins, Vermeer's mother-in-law, upon discovering that the painter had moved into her house.

Montias resided in New Haven. He died in Branford in 2005, as result of complications from melanoma. Montias was buried at Grove Street Cemetery.

== See also ==
- List of Columbia College people
- List of Guggenheim Fellowships awarded in 1961
- List of Yale University people
