= Basil Ellenbogen =

British Army officer

- Born: Basil Katzenellenbogen; 22 December 1917
- Died: 26 January 1996 (aged 78)
- Education: Liverpool Collegiate School; Liverpool University
- Occupation: Consultant physician
- Spouse: Marianne Strauss
- Parent(s): Max Katzenellenbogen; Gertrude Hamburg
- Relatives: Gershon Ellenbogen (brother); Kate Whiteman (niece)

Basil Kazen Ellenbogen (22 December 1917 - 26 January 1996) was a British Army officer and consultant physician.

== Early life ==
Ellenbogen was born Basil Katzenellenbogen in Liverpool, the son of Max Katzenellenbogen and Gertrude Hamburg. His brother was the barrister and author Gershon Ellenbogen. He was educated at Liverpool Collegiate School and Liverpool University, where he studied medicine, graduating in 1941.

== Selected publications ==
- A Therapeutic Index, by Clarence Montague Miller and Basil Kazen Ellenbogen (1955)

== Personal life ==
He met his future wife, the author Marianne Strauss (died December 1996), in Düsseldorf, when he was a Captain in the British Army attached to the occupying forces after World War II. They spent the rest of their lives in Liverpool.

He was much more Orthodox in his Judaism than his wife, whose parents had only been irregular visitors to the synagogue.

They had two children.
