= Elisabeth Neurdenburg =

Dutch art historian

- Born: 6 August 1882; Breda
- Died: 30 April 1957 (aged 74); De Bilt

Elisabeth Neurdenburg (1882–1957) was a Dutch art historian.

She contributed to the large inventory of 17th-century Dutch paintings by Cornelis Hofstede de Groot, and became a specialist on Dutch Kraak ware. She was a close friend of the Dutch art historian and museum director Ida Caroline Eugenie Peelen.

== Works ==
- Old Dutch pottery and tiles, 1923
- Hofstede de Groot's final Volume 10 of Beschreibendes kritisches Verzeichnis der Werke der hervorragendsten Holländischen Mahler des XVII. Jahrhunderts (1907–28), on Frans van Mieris, Willem van Mieris, Adriaen van der Werff, Rachel Ruysch, Jan van Huysum, produced with assistance by Otto Hirschmann, and Kurt Bauch, 1928
- Hendrick de Keyser, beeldhouwer en bouwmeester van Amsterdam, 1934
