= Marianne Strauß =

Marianne Strauß may refer to:

- Marianne Strauß (née Zwicknagl; 1930–1984), wife of Franz Josef Strauss
- Marianne Strauss (1923–1996), Jewish Holocaust survivor
