= Adolf Katzenellenbogen =

German-born American art historian

- Born: 19 August 1901; Frankfurt
- Died: 30 September 1963, 30 September 1964; Baltimore
- Occupation: Art historian

Adolf Katzenellenbogen (born August 19, 1901, in Frankfurt am Main; died September 30, 1964, in Baltimore) was a German-American art historian.

== Early life and education ==
Adolf Edmund Max Katzenellenbogen was the son of bank director Albert Katzenellenbogen (1863–1942) and Cornelia Josephine Doctor (1870–1941). He had two sisters. His father was murdered in the Maly Trostinez extermination camp. He attended the humanistic Goethe-Gymnasium in Frankfurt and studied law at the University of Giessen from 1920, where he received his doctorate in 1924. From 1926 to 1929 and from 1930 to 1933, he studied art history and philosophy in Leipzig and Hamburg and was awarded his doctorate in Hamburg in 1933 with a dissertation on Psychomachia under Erwin Panofsky. He married the Swiss piano teacher Elisabeth Holzheu (1904–1983) in 1935 and the couple had two children, including John Katzenellenbogen, later a chemistry professor at Illinois.

== Nazi era ==
When the Nazis came to power in Germany in 1933, the Katzenellenbogen family was persecuted because Jewish. Katenellenbogen's father was deported and murdered. Their property was Aryanized in 1940. Katzenellenbogen was forced out of his profession. During the antisemitic Nazi Kristallnacht pogroms in November 1938, he was imprisoned for three weeks in Dachau concentration camp. Released, he fled to Switzerland and from there to the USA via England.

Erwin Panofsky and Walter S. Cook (Walter William Spencer Cook; 1888–1962) from New York University helped him find a job, and Katzenellenbogen became Visiting Lecturer at Vassar College in Poughkeepsie in 1940, Assistant Professor in 1943, Associate Professor in 1947 and Professor in 1953. He was granted US citizenship in 1946. In 1956 he became visiting professor at Smith College and from 1958 he held a professorship at Johns Hopkins University in Baltimore. There he developed the art history course into one of the leading courses in the USA. Gary Schwartz, who later specialized in Rembrandt, was one of his students. The University of Freiburg im Breisgau invited Katzenellenbogen to become a visiting professor in 1963.

== Selected works ==
- Die Psychomachie in der Kunst des Mittelalters von den Anfängen bis zum 13. Jahrhundert. Hamburg, 1933 Hamburg, Phil. Diss., ms.
- Allegories of the virtues and vices in mediaeval art : from early Christian times to the thirteenth century. Übersetzung Alan J. P. Crick. London 1939; Norton, New York 1964.
- The Central Tympanum at Vézelay: Its Encyclopedic Meaning and Its Relation to the First Crusade. In: Art Bulletin, 1944, S. 141–151.
- The sculptural programs of Chartres cathedral : Christ, Mary, Ecclesia. Johns Hopkins Press, Baltimore 1959. ISBN 978-0-608-11470-5.

== Literature ==
- Katzenellenbogen, Adolf. In: Ulrike Wendland: Biographisches Handbuch deutschsprachiger Kunsthistoriker im Exil. Leben und Werk der unter dem Nationalsozialismus verfolgten und vertriebenen Wissenschaftler. Saur, München 1999, ISBN 3-598-11339-0, S. 357–359.
- Katzenellenbogen, Adolf. In: Werner Röder, Herbert A. Strauss (Hrsg.): International Biographical Dictionary of Central European Emigrés 1933–1945. Band 2,1. Saur, München 1983, ISBN 3-598-10089-2, S. 603.
