= Benita Katzenellenbogen =

American professor of physiology and cell biology

Benita S. Katzenellenbogen
- Born: Benita Schulman; April 11, 1945 (age 81); New York City
- Education: Harvard University
- Occupation: Cell biologist

Benita S. Katzenellenbogen née Schulman (born 1945) is an American physiologist and cell biologist at the University of Illinois at Urbana-Champaign. She has studied cancer, endocrinology, and women's health, focusing on nuclear receptors. She also dedicated efforts to focusing on improving the effectiveness of endocrine therapies in breast cancer.

== Biography ==
Katzenellenbogen's work has delineated structure-function relationships and mechanisms of action of estrogen receptors alpha and beta. She has clarified the molecular basis of action of SERMs such as tamoxifen and raloxifene in treatment and prevention of breast cancer, and she has identified critical aggressiveness factors in breast tumors that promote metastasis and resistance to cancer therapies. She has studied approaches to inhibit them.

=== Early life ===
Benita Schulman was born April 11, 1945, in New York City. Her father was a patent attorney and her mother was a school teacher in New York. She attended public schools and did her undergraduate training in biology at the City University of New York (Brooklyn College), receiving her BA summa cum laude in 1965. She obtained her Ph.D. in biology at Harvard University in 1970, doing research in Developmental Biology with Professor Fotis Kafatos. She completed postdoctoral work in endocrinology and cancer biology at the University of Illinois at Urbana-Champaign from 1970 to 1971 with Professor Jack Gorski.

=== Career ===
Katzenellenbogen began her academic career as an Assistant Professor of Physiology at the University of Illinois and College of Medicine at Urbana-Champaign in 1971. She was promoted to Associate Professor in 1976, and to Full Professor in 1982. She is currently the Swanlund Professor of Molecular and Integrative Physiology, Cell and Developmental Biology at the University of Illinois. She also holds affiliate appointments in the Institute for Genomic Biology and the Beckman Institute for Advanced Science and Technology at Illinois. Additionally, from September 1977 to June 1978, Katzenellenbogen did sabbatical research at the University of California at San Francisco, and in 2005 she conducted collaborative sabbatical research at the Genome Institute of Singapore. Her professional career has been directed at elucidating cellular and molecular mechanisms of steroid hormone-mediated regulation of reproductive target tissues and of tumors that develop in these tissues, especially breast cancer.

Katzenellenbogen has published more than 330 research articles, contributed 30 book chapters, and co-edited a book on hormone-dependent cancers. She has trained more than 90 graduate students and postdoctoral scientists and has overseen numerous undergraduates in their biomedical research. For her activities in mentoring, she was recognized with the Mentor Award from Women in Endocrinology in 2011. She is also the recipient of numerous other awards, honors, and special fellowships from governmental, private, and academic institutions. These include the MERIT Award from the National Cancer Institute of the NIH (1991-1999), the Brinker Award for Scientific Distinction from the Susan G. Komen for the Cure Breast Cancer Foundation (2009), the Jill Rose Award from The Breast Cancer Research Foundation (1998), the Ernst Oppenheimer Award (1984), and the Roy O. Greep Lecture Award from The Endocrine Society (2006). In 2016, she shared the Fred Conrad Koch Lifetime Achievement Award from The Endocrine Society with Dr. John Katzenellenbogen. She was elected a Fellow of the American Academy of Arts and Sciences (1993), and she received a Distinguished Alumni Award from The City University of New York in 2002 and an Honorary Degree from the University of Milan, Italy (2007).

She has served on many committees and review panels, journal editorial boards, and as President of The Endocrine Society (2000–2001). She served full terms on the NIH Endocrinology (1979-1983) and Biochemical Endocrinology Study Sections (1995-1999), was Vice Chair of the American Cancer Society Review Panel on Biochemistry and Endocrinology (1992-1993), and was Chair of the NIH, NIDDK Board of Scientific Counselors (1988-1989). She served as a member of the External Advisory Committee for the NIH Nuclear Receptor Signaling Atlas (2002-2012) and on Review Panels for Komen for the Cure, the DOD Breast Cancer Program, and on NIH graduate and postdoctoral fellowship review committees. She co-chaired the Hormone Action Gordon Research Conference in 1988 and the Keystone Symposium on The Nuclear Receptor Superfamily in 2002.

== Research ==
Katzenellenbogen has clarified structure-function relationships and actions of estrogen receptors alpha and beta, and demonstrated that estrogens have a broad spectrum of effects on gene networks and pathways in breast cancer and other cells. This research has contributed to understanding of the molecular basis for the action of selective estrogen receptor modulators (SERMs) such as tamoxifen in target cells, and for the development of anti-hormonal treatments used in breast cancer treatment and prevention. Her laboratory demonstrated that estrogen receptors regulate and function along with multiple cell signaling pathways involving kinase cascades and growth factors, and that these inputs converge at the level of chromatin to regulate gene expression and cell signaling. This work presaged the current active interest in both the non-genomic actions of estrogens and the cross-talk between nuclear receptors and other cell signaling pathways and their roles in endocrine resistance. Her laboratory has also identified factors associated with aggressiveness and early time to cancer recurrence and their regulation in different subtypes of breast cancer. She has also characterized the activities of estrogens in menopausal hormone replacement therapies and diverse ligands for estrogen receptors, including environmental estrogens, phytoestrogens such as genistein, and estrogen receptor subtype-selective ligands in various estrogen target tissues.
