= Ida Peelen =

Dutch art historian and museum director

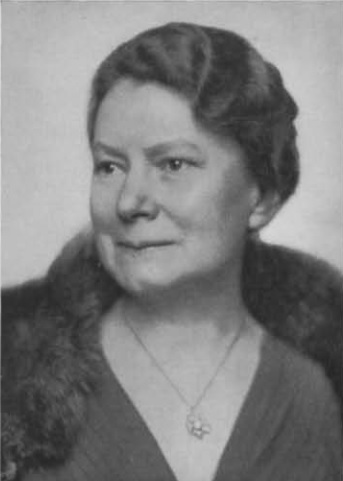
- Born: Ida Caroline Eugenie Peelen; 10 November 1882; Palembang, Indonesia
- Died: 10 March 1965 (aged 82); Zeist, Netherlands
- Occupations: Museum Director, Art Historian

Ida Caroline Eugenie Peelen (1882–1965) was a Dutch art historian and museum director. She was the first female director of a national museum in the Netherlands, the Museum Lambert van Meerten in Delft.

== Life ==
Peelen was born in Palembang, Dutch East Indies on 10 November 1882. She studied art history with Dutch art historian Willem Vogelsang (1875-1954). In 1906 Peelen became the first woman to work full-time at the Amsterdam Rijksmuseum. Her specialty was crafts, specifically ceramics, and most specifically Dutch porcelain.

In 1918, Peelen became director of the Museum Lambert van Meerten, a museum in Delft. In 1929 she also took on the directorship of the Rijksmuseum HW Mesdag (The Mesdag Collection) in The Hague and through 1934 she ran both museums. When she retired in 1947 she was invested as a Ridder in de Orde van Oranje-Nassau (Knight of the Order of Orange-Nassau).

Peelen applied her energies to art history, museum administration, and education. Her close friends were Elisabeth Korevaar-Hesseling and Elisabeth Neurdenburg, both art historians. She never married. Outside of art history she was an editor of the bulletin of the Dutch Archaeological Society. Peelen died on 10 March 1965 in Zeist, Netherlands.
