= Peter Whiteman =

British barrister

- Born: Peter George Whiteman; 8 August 1942 (age 83)
- Occupation: Barrister
- Spouse(s): Kate Whiteman (died 2009) Sally Patricia Mary Carter (m. 2017)
- Children: Victoria and Caroline Whiteman
- Relatives: Gershon Ellenbogen (father-in-law)

Peter George Whiteman KC (born 8 August 1942) is a retired British barrister, judge, professor and author.

== Career ==
Whiteman has been a deputy high court judge since 1994, and professor of law at the University of Virginia since 1980, and a visiting professor at the University of California Berkeley since 1980.

== Personal life ==
Whiteman was married to Katharine Ruth Ellenbogen in 1971 and they had two daughters. Katharine was killed in a road accident in Argentina in 2009. Whiteman retired in December 2014 and in 2017 he married Sally Patricia Mary Carter on a beach in Antigua.

== Selected publications ==
- Whiteman on Income Tax (1988)
- Whiteman on Capital Gains Tax (1988)
- British Tax Encyclopedia (1988)
- No Bar To Success (2016)
