= Peter C. Sutton =

American art historian (born 1949)

- Born: Peter Campbell Sutton; March 30, 1949 (age 77); Boston, Massachusetts, United States
- Occupations: Art historian Curator
- Spouse: Mary Lynn Riesmeyer (m. 1981)
- Children: 2

Academic background
- Education: Harvard University; Yale University
- Thesis: Pieter de Hooch, 1629-1684 (1978)
- Influences: Egbert Haverkamp-Begemann; Seymour Slive

Academic work
- Discipline: Art history
- Sub-discipline: Dutch art

Peter Campbell Sutton (born March 30, 1949) is an American art historian. A specialist on seventeenth-century Dutch art, Sutton was the Susan E. Lynch Executive Director and Chief Executive Officer of the Bruce Museum of Arts and Science from 2001 to 2019.

== Career ==
Born in Boston, Massachusetts, to Francis Xavier and Jacqueline Young, Sutton was raised in Washington, Connecticut. He graduated from The Frederick Gunn School in 1968. Sutton received his Bachelor of Arts from Harvard University in 1972, and both a Master of Arts and a PhD from Yale University in 1975 and 1978, respectively. He is a specialist on seventeenth-century Dutch art and has written extensively on the subject, especially on the artist Pieter de Hooch, which was the subject of his doctoral dissertation.

After graduating, Sutton was hired as Assistant Curator of European Paintings at the Philadelphia Museum of Art from 1979 to 1983, and was promoted to Associate Curator until 1985. He then became the Russell W. Curator of European Paintings at the Museum of Fine Arts, Boston, replacing John Walsh, in the following year until 1994. Sutton also spent time as Senior Director of Old Master Paintings at Christie’s in New York City from 1994 to 1996.

In 1996, Sutton was named Director of the Wadsworth Atheneum Museum of Art in Hartford. In 2001, Sutton was hired as the Susan E. Lynch Executive Director and Chief Executive Officer of the Bruce Museum of Arts and Science in Greenwich. In 2019, Sutton retired and was succeeded by Robert Wolterstorff.

== Personal life ==
On March 7, 1981, Sutton married Mary Lynn Riesmeyer, with whom he had two children.

== See also ==
- List of Harvard University people
- List of Yale University people
