= Elbogen =

Elbogen or Ellenbogen (meaning elbow in German) may refer to:

- Elbogen, the German name for Loket, a town in the Czech Republic
- The Swedish city of Malmö, known as Elbogen in German during the 14th to 16th centuries
- The Elbogen, meteorite of the year 1400
- Ellenbogen (Rhön), one of the Rhön mountains in Germany
- Ellenbogen (Sylt), the tip of the island of Sylt and the northernmost point in Germany

== People with the surname ==
- Abram Ellenbogen (1883–1929), American lawyer, politician, and judge
- Bill Ellenbogen (born 1950), American football player
- Eric Elbogen, founder of band Say Hi To Your Mom
- Heinrich Elbogen (1872–1927), Austrian sports shooter who competed in the 1912 Summer Olympics
- Ismar Elbogen (1874–1943), Polish-German rabbi
- Jenny Elbogen (1882–1957), German-speaking Esperantist and translator from Austria
- Gershon Ellenbogen (1917–2003), British barrister, author and Liberal Party politician
- Henry Ellenbogen (1900–1985), American politician
- Marc S. Ellenbogen (born 1963), chairman of the Global Panel Foundation and president of the Prague Society
- Dame Naomi Ellenbogen (born 1970), British High Court Judge
