= Arthur K. Wheelock Jr. =

American art historian (born 1943)

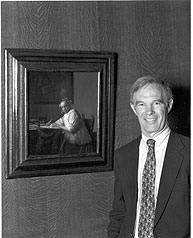
- Wheelock, in front of A Lady Writing a Letter painted by Johannes Vermeer, at the National Gallery of Art.
- Born: Arthur Kingsland Wheelock Jr. May 13, 1943 (age 83); Uxbridge, Massachusetts, U.S.
- Occupations: Art historian Curator; Professor
- Spouses: Susan Hoffman (m. 1964–1988) Perry Carpenter Swain (m. 1991)
- Children: 3
- Relatives: Ralph Wheelock (ancestor)

Academic background
- Education: Williams College; Harvard University
- Thesis: The Shifting Relationship of Perspective to Optics and its Manifestation in Paintings by Artists in Delft around 1650 (1973)
- Influences: Egbert Haverkamp-Begemann; Seymour SliveSeymour Slive

Academic work
- Discipline: Art history
- Sub-discipline: Dutch art

Arthur Kingsland Wheelock Jr. (born May 13, 1943, in Uxbridge, Massachusetts) is an American art historian, who served as Curator of Northern Baroque Paintings at the National Gallery of Art in Washington, D.C. until retiring in 2018. Wheelock also teaches as a professor of art history at the University of Maryland.

== Early life and education ==
The son of Arthur, former president of Stanley Woolen Mill, and Ann Kneass. His father's side is descendant from Ralph Wheelock, attributed to be the forerunner of founding public education in the United States. Wheelock grew up in Uxbridge and graduated from Phillips Exeter Academy in 1961, and then received a Bachelor of Arts in art history from Williams College in 1965, where he was part of the Delta Upsilon fraternity.

He then went on to receive a Doctor of Philosophy from Harvard University in 1973, with a dissertation titled "The Shifting Relationship of Perspective to Optics and its Manifestation in Paintings by Artists in Delft around 1650."

== Career ==
Wheelock began his career in museums as a David E. Finley Fellow at the National Gallery of Art in 1973 and later was also named Research Curator, under director J. Carter Brown. He also commenced teaching at the University of Maryland, where he has held the post of Professor of Art History.

Wheelock was appointed Curator of Dutch and Flemish Painting at the National Gallery of Art two years later, which eventually led to his appointment as Curator of Northern Baroque Paintings. He has lectured widely on Dutch and Flemish art and has authored several publications on the subjects, particularly concerning Johannes Vermeer, church painters, and those interested in optics.

He curated one of the first exhibitions on the Dutch painter Judith Leyster, titled 'Judith Leyster: The First Woman to Become a Master Painter', which was on display at the National Gallery of Art from June 21-November 29, 2009.

In 2018, he received the honorary degree of Doctor of Arts from Dickinson University.

== Awards and honors ==
- Knight of the Order of Orange-Nassau (1982)
- College Art Association Award for Distinction in Scholarship and Conservation (1993)
- Williams College Bicentennial Medal (1996)
- Commander of the Order of Leopold (2006)
- Art Libraries Society of North America George Wittenborn Memorial Book Award (2014)
- Williams College Kellogg Award (2015)

== Personal life ==
Wheelock married Susan Hoffman on June 13, 1964, with whom he had three children: Laura, Matthew, and Tobey. He and Hoffman divorced in 1988, and on August 24, 1991, he married Perry Carpenter Swain.

== See also ==
- List of Delta Upsilon brothers
- List of Phillips Exeter Academy people
- List of people from Uxbridge, Massachusetts
- List of Rembrandt connoisseurs and scholars
- List of University of Maryland, College Park people
- List of Williams College Bicentennial Medal winners
- List of Williams College people
