= List of Williams College Bicentennial Medal winners =

The Williams College Bicentennial Medal, was created by Williams College in 1993, the College's 200th anniversary. The Bicentennial Medals "honor members of the Williams community for distinguished achievement in any field of endeavor."

The following is a table listing the number of winners who graduated per five-year period.

Year	1920-1924	1925-1929	1930-1934	1935-1939	1940-1944	1945-1949	1950-1954	1955-1959	1960-1964	1965-1969
Number of Grads	1	3	0	6	4	7	10	8	10	7

Year	1970-1974	1975-1979	1980-1984	1985-1989	1990-1994	1995-1999	2000-2004
Number of Grads	13	21	13	12	2	0	1

== 1993 ==
- John C. Bennett, Class of 1924
- Michael Beschloss, Class of 1977
- Janet H. Brown, Class of 1973
- James M. Burns, Class of 1939
- Dennis Butler, Class of 1987
- Lucy Calkins, Class of 1973
- Delos M. Cosgrove, Class of 1962
- Gordon J. Davis, Class of 1963
- Rev. Charles W. Gilchrist, Class of 1958
- William Hoch, Class of 1989
- Lee F. Jackson, Class of 1979
- Kristine Karlson, Class of 1985
- Colin McCord, Class of 1949
- Charlotte Neuville, Class of 1973
- Robert Oxnam, Class of 1964
- Michael Reed, Class of 1975
- Jack Sawyer, Class of 1939
- Whitney S. Stoddard, Class of 1935
- M. Jay Tarses, Class of 1961
- Telford Taylor, Class of 1928
- Kirk Varnedoe, Class of 1967
- E. Wayne Wilkins, Class of 1941
- Del de Windt, Class of 1943

== 1994 ==
- Stephen S. Clarey, Class of 1962
- Steven A. Gould, Class of 1968
- Tracy P. Lewis, Class of 1983
- John Malcolm, Class of 1972
- J. Hodge Markgraf, Class of 1952
- Jon Stone, Class of 1952

== 1995 ==
- William M. Boyd II, Class of 1963
- John W. Chandler
- Joseph C. Harsch, Class of 1927
- William M. Partington, Class of 1950
- Earl A. Powell III, Class of 1966
- Ellen Vargyas, Class of 1971

== 1996 ==
- S. Lane Faison, Class of 1929
- Tao Ho, Class of 1960
- Wendy W. Jacob, Class of 1980
- John R. Lane, Class of 1966
- Channing G. Lowe, Class of 1975
- A. Laurie Palmer, Class of 1981
- Arthur K. Wheelock Jr., Class of 1965

== 1997 ==
- John Frankenheimer, Class of 1951
- Paul Grogan, Class of 1972
- A. Clayton Spencer, Class of 1977
- Henry Strong, Class of 1949
- John Toland, Class of 1936
- Rev. Preston Washington, Class of 1970

== 1998 ==
- Dr. Lisa Capaldini, Class of 1978
- Stephen Case, Class of 1980
- William Finn, Class of 1974
- George Kennedy, Class of 1948
- Richard Moe, Class of 1959
- Dr. Frank Richards, Class of 1975
- Martha A. Williamson, Class of 1977

== 1999 ==
- Tsong-Zung J. Chang, Class of 1973
- Martha M. Coakley, Class of 1975
- Dominick Dunne, Class of 1949
- Henry N. Flynt Jr., Class of 1944
- James P. Stearns, Class of 1970
- Joseph C. Thompson, Class of 1981

== 2000 ==
- David Battey, Class of 1985
- Richard Helms, Class of 1935
- George Hyde, Class of 1949
- Margaret Lowman, Class of 1976
- Steven Rogers, Class of 1979

== 2001 ==
- Robert J. Kelleher, Class of 1935
- Arthur Levitt Jr., Class of 1952
- Karen DeLong Parles, Class of 1981
- William Bo S. Peabody, Class of 1994
- Dr. Deborah M. Robinson, Class of 1978
- Gregory H. Zaff, Class of 1984

== 2002 ==
- Mitchell J. Besser, Class of 1976
- Robert T. Coulter, Class of 1966
- Patricia Hellman Gibbs, Class of 1982
- Alvin B. Kernan, Class of 1949
- John W. Kifner, Class of 1963
- Charles H. Shaw, Class of 1955

== 2003 ==
- Charles M. Collins, Class of 1969
- Stephen J. Farley, Class of 1985
- Regina A. Kelly, Class of 1986
- Stephen S. Marino, Class of 1976
- Edmund M. Mauro Jr., Class of 1954
- George H. McCracken Jr., Class of 1958
- Stacy Schiff, Class of 1982

== 2004 ==
- Felix Grossman, Class of 1956
- Sonia Nazario, Class of 1982
- Clarence Otis, Class of 1977
- Richard Repp, Class of 1957
- Kevin White, Class of 1952

== 2005 ==
- Glenn Lowry, Class of 1976
- Bernard Bailyn, Class of 1944
- Edgar Bronfman, Sr., Class of 1950
- A. R. Gurney, Class of 1952
- Inigo Manglano-Ovalle, Class of 1983
- Marisa Reddy Randazzo, Class of 1989

== 2006 ==
- Elizabeth A. Andersen, Class of 1987
- Gregory M. Avis, Class of 1980
- Stanley O. Foster, Class of 1955
- Eric Reeves, Class of 1972
- Catherine M. Salser, Class of 1988
- Anna L. Waring, Class of 1978

== 2007 ==
- Stephen R. Lewis, Class of 1960
- Thomas Payzant, Class of 1962
- H. Ward Marston IV, Class of 1973
- Reed Zars, Class of 1977
- Alice P. Albright, Class of 1983
- Margaret G. Kim, Class of 1991

== 2008 ==
- Dean Cycon, Class of 1975
- Dickinson R. Debevoise, Class of 1946
- Mayda A. Del Valle, Class of 2000
- Michael J. Govan, Class of 1985
- Eugene C. Latham, Class of 1955
- Susan Schwab, Class of 1976

== 2009 ==
- Mark Udall, Class of 1972
- Karen Ashby, Class of 1979
- Mika Brzezinski, Class of 1989
- Gary Fisketjon, Class of 1976
- John F. Raynolds, Class of 1951

== 2010 ==
- Daniel Kleppner, Class of 1953
- William H. Eddy Jr., class of 1949
- William E. Spriggs, class of 1977
- Joshua M. Kraft, class of 1989
- Camille L. Utterback, class of 1992

== 2018 ==
- John L. Walcott, Class of 1971
- Cheryl C. Robinson Joyner, Class of 1985
- Michael A. Wynn, Class of 1993
- Shoshana Clark Stewart, Class of 2002

== 2019 ==
- Kiat W. Tan, Class of 1965
- Martin A. Samuels, Class of 1967
- Danielle Deane-Ryan, Class of 1997
- Carina Vance Mafla, Class of 1999

== 2021 ==
- Valerie A. DiFebo, Class of 1984

== 2022 ==
- Elizabeth Hohmann, Class of 1980
- Pamela Council, Class of 2007
- Katherine Krieg Fischer, Class of 2008
- Anouk Dey, Class of 2009
- Lina Khan, Class of 2010
- Adena Friedman, Class of 1991

== 2023 ==
- Philip Geier, Class of 1970
- The Honorable Anita Earls, Class of 1981
- Rebecca Haile, Class of 1986
- Robert Kim, Class of 1992
- Robbi Behr, Class of 1997
- Matthew Swanson, Class of 1997
