= Egbert Haverkamp-Begemann =

American art historian

- Born: March 6, 1923; Naarden, Netherlands
- Died: August 5, 2017 (aged 94); New York City, New York, United States
- Occupations: Art historian Professor; Curator
- Spouse: Clarice Pennock
- Children: 4

Academic background
- Education: Utrecht University
- Thesis: Willem Buytewech (1958)
- Doctoral advisor: Jan Gerrit van Gelder
- Influences: Erwin Panofsky; Seymour Slive

Academic work
- Discipline: Art history
- Sub-discipline: Dutch art
- Institutions: Museum Boijmans Van Beuningen; New York University; Metropolitan Museum of Art; The Morgan Library & Museum
- Notable students: Thomas Krens; Peter C. Sutton
- Influenced: John Michael Montias; Gary Schwartz; Arthur K. Wheelock Jr.

Egbert Haverkamp-Begemann OON (6 March 1923 – 5 August 2017) was a Dutch American art historian and professor.

== Career ==
Born in Naarden, Haverkamp-Begemann spent most of his childhood in Kemerovo and Moscow in Russia, where his father worked as an engineer. After a year in Morocco, the family returned to the Netherlands in the late 1930s. Haverkamp-Begemann finished high school in Dordrecht, and initially studied law, but soon turned to art history. He completed a Doctor of Philosophy in Art History with honors at Utrecht University in 1958. Haverkamp-Begemann's dissertation was on the Dutch Golden Age painter Willem Pieterszoon Buytewech, which was supervised by Jan Gerrit van Gelder.

In 1950, Haverkamp-Begemann was hired as Curator of Drawings, and later Curator of Paintings, at the Museum Boijmans Van Beuningen in Rotterdam. In 1959, he moved to the United States to conduct research at the Institute for Advanced Study, as well as at Harvard University. In the following year, Haverkamp-Begemann was named Curator of Drawings and Prints of the Yale University Art Gallery, a position which he held until 1974. In his final four years there, he chaired that department. Haverkamp-Begemann also taught art history at the school.

In 1965, Haverkamp-Begemann received a Guggenheim Fellowship in Fine Arts Research.

In 1978, Haverkamp-Begemann began a long tenure at the New York University Institute of Fine Arts. He was named John Langeloth Loeb Professor in the History of Art, which later turned into an emeritus position upon retirement in 1988. He also would become Curator of Dutch and Flemish Paintings at the Metropolitan Museum of Art. From 2001 to 2004, Haverkamp-Begemann served as Acting Head of the Department of Prints and Drawings at The Morgan Library & Museum.

In 1983, Anne-Marie S. Logan and other colleagues published a festschrift in honor of Haverkamp-Begemann titled Essays in Northern European Art: Presented to Egbert Haverkamp-Begemann on his Sixtieth Birthday.

Haverkamp-Begemann was named an Officer of the Order of Orange Nassau. He died in New York City in 2017.

== Works ==
- Creative Copies: Interpretative Drawings from Michelangelo to Picasso
- Rembrandt, the Nightwatch
- Art And Autoradiography: Insights Into The Genesis Of Paintings By Rembrandt, Van Dyck And Vermeer
- The Robert Lehman Collection
- The Robert Lehman Collection at the Metropolitan Museum of Art

== See also ==
- List of Guggenheim Fellowships awarded in 1965
- List of Rembrandt connoisseurs and scholars
- List of works about Rembrandt
