= Jan Gerrit van Gelder =

Dutch art historian

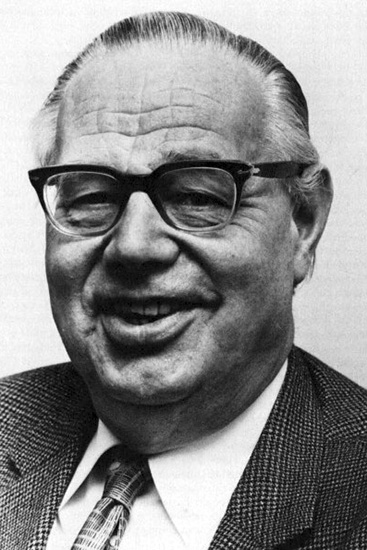
Jan Gerrit van Gelder

Jan Gerrit van Gelder (Alkmaar, 27 February 1903 – Utrecht, 9 December 1980) was a Dutch art historian.

== Life and work ==
Van Gelder was the son of the archivist and museum director, Hendrik Enno van Gelder. He grew up in The Hague. In 1923, he began studying art history at Utrecht University. In 1924 he was appointed by the Museum Boijmans Van Beuningen in Rotterdam, where he worked as an assistant and later as curator in the print room and the library. In 1933, he completed his Ph.D. dissertation under Willem Vogelsang on Jan van de Velde. In 1936, he was appointed lecturer in art history at Leiden University and in 1940 acting director of the Netherlands Institute for Art History in The Hague. From 1945 on, Van Gelder was director of the Mauritshuis. In the same year, he succeeded Hans Schneider as director of Netherlands Institute for Art History. In 1946 he was appointed professor of art history at Utrecht University.

In 1947, he created the art historical magazine, Nederlands Kunsthistorisch Jaarboek, and in 1966, Simiolus. He was also an active member of the editorial board of Oud Holland and a regular contributor to The Burlington Magazine and many other art historical journals.

In 1951 he became a member of the Royal Netherlands Academy of Arts and Sciences. He was also a member of the Fondation Custodia and the Institut Néerlandais, both in Paris, and the Istituto Universitario Olandese di Storia dell'Arte in Florence.

Employing a social history approach in his research, Van Gelder wrote about Rembrandt, Peter Paul Rubens, Anthony van Dyck, Adam Elsheimer, Aelbert Cuyp, Jan van Scorel, Jan Vermeer, Vincent van Gogh and (with his wife Ingrid Jost) Jan de Bisschop.

== Select publications ==
- Jan van de Velde, 1593-1641, teekenaar-schilder. The Hague 1933.
- Kunstgeschiedenis en Kunst, The Hague, 1946.
- Vincent van Gogh: the Potato Eaters, in the Collection of V. W. Van Gogh, Amsterdam. London 1947.
- Prenten en tekeningen. Amsterdam 1958.
- (with J. A. Emmens), De schilderkunst van Jan Vermeer: een voordracht. Utrecht 1958.
- Dutch Drawings and Prints. New York 1959.
- (with Ingrid Jost), Jan de Bisschop and his Icones & Paradigmata. Classical Antiquities and Italian Drawings for Artistic Instruction in Seventeenth Century Holland. Edited by Keith Andrews. Doornspijk 1985.
