= Kate Whiteman =

British food writer (1945–2009)

- Born: Katherine Eellenbogen; 16 February 1945; London, England
- Died: 4 January 2009 (aged 63)
- Occupation: Food writer
- Spouse: Peter Whiteman
- Children: Victoria and Caroline
- Parent(s): Gershon Ellenbogen; Eileen Alexander

Katherine Whiteman (16 February 1945 – 4 January 2009) was a British food writer.

== Early life ==
She was born Katherine Ellenbogen in Hampstead, London, England, he daughter of Gershon Ellenbogen, a British barrister, author and Liberal Party politician, and his wife Eileen Alexander.

== Career ==
Whiteman edited books by the chefs Michel Roux, Raymond Blanc and Pierre Koffman.

== Personal life ==
She was married to the barrister Peter Whiteman QC, and they had two daughters.

Whiteman died in a car accident in Argentina on 4 January 2009.

== Legacy ==
The Guild of Food Writers created the Kate Whiteman Award for Work on Food and Travel in her honour. It has been awarded to Michael Booth and Yotam Ottolenghi, among others.
