= Hendrik Enno van Gelder =

Dutch art museum curator

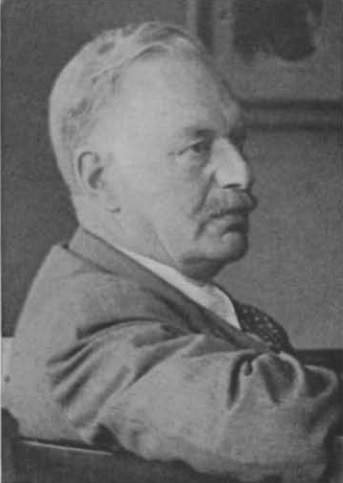
- H.E. van Gelder
- Born: February 16, 1876; The Hague
- Died: June 24, 1960 (aged 84)
- Other names: H.E. van Gelder
- Occupations: Museum curator; Dutch archivist
- Years active: 1912 -1941
- Spouse(s): Johanna Helena, née Scalongne
- Children: 4 sons
- Awards: Order of Orange-Nassau 1945; Golden Medal of Honor 1956

Hendrik Enno van Gelder also known as H.E. van Gelder (February 16, 1876 - June 24, 1960) was a Dutch archivist and museum director. He was also an art historian and author of several books about art.

== Early life ==
He was born in the Hague, Amsterdam on February 16, 1876. He was the grandson of writer Nicolaas Beets. He attended the Gymnasium at Amsterdam. From 1895 to 1899, he attended the University of Amsterdam studying Law and Political Science and he earned his doctorate in 1899.

== Career ==
In 1912, he began work as an archivist at The Hague, and he was also the curator of the municipal museum. He retired in 1941.

In 1945 he was appointed Commander in the Order of Orange-Nassau. In 1956 he received the Golden Medal of Honor and the honorary citizenship of the municipality of The Hague.

=== Books ===
In 1916 he authored a book titled Catalogus van de verzameling Haagsch porcelein. In 1952 he wrote a book titled Guide to Dutch Art. In 1953 he authored a book titled Rembrandt.

== Personal life ==
On May 22, 1902, he married Johanna Helena, née Scalongne, and together they had four sons. One of his sons was Jan Gerrit van Gelder who also became an art historian. H.E. van Gelder died June 24, 1960.
