= Jack Gorski =

American reproductive biologist

- Born: March 14, 1931; Green Bay, Wisconsin, United States
- Died: August 30, 2006 (aged 75)
- Education: University of Wisconsin-Madison (B.S.); Washington State University (Ph.D.)
- Scientific career
- Fields: reproductive biology

Jack Gorski (1931-2006) was an American reproductive biologist who was a pioneer in estrogen endocrinology. Jack Gorski was born in Green Bay, Wisconsin, earned a B.S. degree from the University of Wisconsin-Madison and a Ph.D. degree from the Washington State University. In 1958, he started postdoctoral research on the action of estrogens at Mcardle Laboratory for Cancer Research, University of Wisconsin. Hence, he continued to expand his interest in steroid biochemistry. He found estrogen receptors almost at the same time as Elwood V. Jensen and laid the foundation for the study of steroid nuclear receptors. In 1986 he was elected a fellow of the American Academy of Arts and Sciences and in 1993 a member of the National Academy of Sciences.
