= Ostap Ortwin =

Polish journalist (1876–1942)

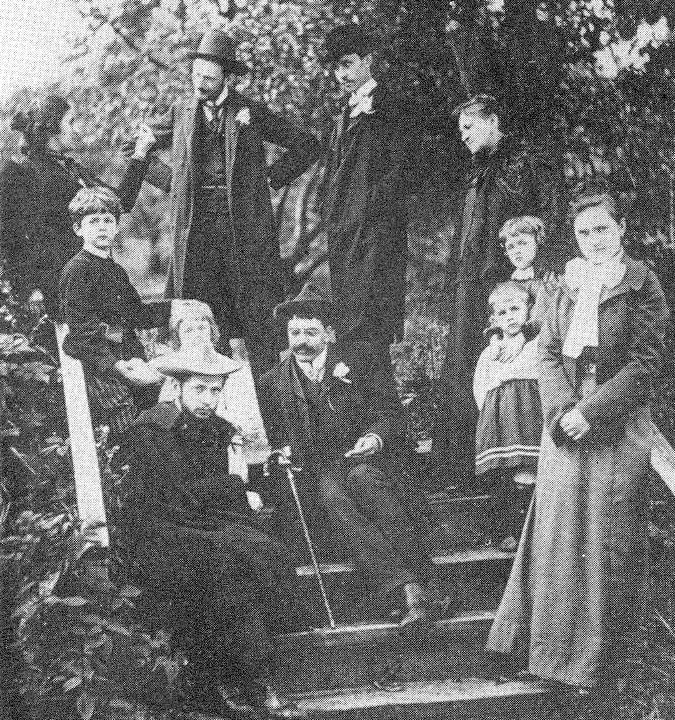
The "Płanetnicy" literary group in Lwów. Ostap Ortwin is sitting on the right, next to Leopold Staff

Ostap Ortwin (real name Oskar Katzenellenbogen) (born 23 November 1876; murdered in spring 1942 in Lwów) was a Polish Jewish journalist and literary critic.

He was born in Tłumacz, near Stanisławów (now Ivano-Frankivsk, Ukraine). His father, Henryk, was a director and an engineer at a sugar factory, and his mother's name was Maria Jadwiga. In 1899 he finished law studies at the University of Lwów. His thesis adviser was the famous Polish logician and philosopher Kazimierz Twardowski.

He belonged to the Young Poland literary group "Płanetnicy", which met at the house of the poet Maryla Wolska. Wolska was considered to be of the most intriguing characters of the Lwów literary scene, known for his exhaustive knowledge of Polish law as well as a powerful physique and imposing presence.

His theatrical critiques were considered highly original and poignant. He was a frequent visitor at the "Kasyno Literackie" ("Literary Casino"), a cultural organization which held discussion nights and balls. Ortwin became widely known after he defended the literary critic and writer Stanisław Brzozowski in court.

In 1904 he gave up his law practice in order to focus on poetry and other writing, including theater reviews. In 1905 he became editor for the publishing house Polish Bookstore, owned by Bernard Połoniecki.

When World War I broke out he was drafted into the Austrian army where he began service as a private in the 55th Infantry Battalion. Later he was made a lawyer in the military court of Lwów and Ostrawa. He was promoted to the rank of captain, and soon after, major, of the military court of Lwów and in 1922 retired into the reserves.

He became the vice president of the Polish Writers' Union in 1920. In 1934 he was made the president of the Lwów Literary Club. He was a member of the Lwów-Warsaw School of Logic.

After Lwów was occupied by the Soviets in September 1939, he took part in creating a new literary organization, which gathered writers and poets opposed to communism. Lwów was taken over by Nazi Germany in 1942. Despite offers from his friends to help him escape the Holocaust, Ortwin refused to flee or to live in hiding. Sometime in 1942 he was shot in the street by the Nazis.

Józef Wittlin, in his essay My Lwów described him in the following words:

Ostap Ortwin was not a Count but it's hard to imagine a person with a more aristocratic soul and bearing... he discovered Staff and made it possible for Stanisław Brzozowski to become famous and more importantly, to be understood. He was an excellent critic although he often didn't feel like writing, mostly because he spend all his time reading. He read everything, from Spengler to Bend to even all the introductory articles in all the daily papers. He usually expressed his opinions through loud yelling, which shook the large windows at the Cafe Roma where he spent his non-working hours ... He took every undertaking with the utmost seriousness while at the same time he laughed at everyone and himself, in a way that only Olympic Gods could laugh. Ortwin, the last president of the Lwów Literary Club, was probably the only Polish writer of Jewish ethnicity before whom retreated in reverence all the antisemitic idiots. It seemed that in general he was untouchable. Tall, wide shouldered, grey haired, with thick eyebrows and a black Cossack style mustache he presented himself in a way that paralyzed all kinds of scumbags. He argued with and insulted policemen who asked him for identification after he woke up people of Lwów by loudly threatening futurism. Insulted policemen saluted him as if he were their captain ... in 1942 it turned out that Ortwin was not untouchable. The Germans chased that great, trouble making, soul out of his aristocratic body ... If in the after life there are cafes, then without doubt in one of them there now sits Ostap Ortwin, hunched over a pile of newspapers ... and he laughs loudly from behind them, and he reads and he reads and he yells and he laughs at us all until the heavens themselves start to shake"

— Józef Wittlin
