= Gershon Ellenbogen =

- Gershon Ellenbogen
- Born: Gershon Katzenellenbogen; 7 January 1917
- Died: September 2003 (aged 86)
- Education: Liverpool Collegiate School; King's College, Cambridge
- Occupation: Barrister
- Spouses: Eileen Alexander; Myrtle Franklin
- Children: Kate Whiteman (with Eileen Alexander)
- Relatives: Peter Whiteman (son-in-law)

Gershon Ellenbogen (7 January 1917 – September 2003), was a British barrister, author and a Liberal Party politician. He was notable for his contribution to the well known and much used legal reference work the Constitutional Laws of Great Britain.

== Early life ==
Ellenbogen was born Gershon Katzenellenbogen in Liverpool, the son of Max Katzenellenbogen and Gertrude Hamburg. He was educated at Liverpool Collegiate School and King's College, Cambridge, where he was a Foundation Scholar. He won a First Class in the Classical Tripos, then read Moral Sciences for two years and Law for one year. While at Cambridge, he was a contemporary and friend of Alan Turing.

His brother Basil was a physician and author, and his younger brother Raymond Ellenbogen was a dental surgeon.

== Professional career ==
He served six years in the RAF as a Flight-Lieutenant in the Intelligence Branch, serving in Europe and the Middle East, being posted to Cairo in 1943.

He was called to the Bar. He was a Bacon scholar of Gray's Inn, and a Barstow scholar of the Inns of Court. He was an author and lecturer on legal matters, as well as a practising barrister on the Northern Circuit. He wrote English Arbitration Practice and co-authored Questions and Answers on Constitutional Law and Legal History in 1950. In 1952, following an invitation from Owen Hood Phillips, he undertook a major revision of Chalmers and Hood Phillips Constitutional Laws of Great Britain. The reference work was widely regarded as the fullest modern exposition of the law on this subject. He was a frequent contributor to The Times, writing on legal matters.

== Political career ==
He was Liberal candidate for the new Southgate division of Middlesex at the 1950 General Election, finishing third;

General Election 1950: Southgate
Party	Candidate	Votes	%	±%
Conservative	Arthur Beverley Baxter	30,302	61.1	n/a
Labour	Miss Vera Dart	11,023	22.2	n/a
Liberal	Gershon Ellenbogen	8,286	16.7	n/a
Majority		19,279	38.9	n/a
Turnout			86.4	n/a
Conservative win				

He did not stand for parliament again.

== Personal life ==
In 1944 he married Eileen Alexander. They had one daughter, who as Kate Whiteman, became well known as a food writer. His wife died in 1986 and in 1993 he married Myrtle Ruth Franklin (born Myrtle Ruth Sebag-Montefiore), who had been married to David Ellis Franklin (son of Ellis Arthur Franklin) until his death in 2003.

A collection of the letters sent to him by Eileen between 1939 and 1946 was published in 2020 under the title Love in the Blitz.
