= Marianne Strauss =

Marianne Strauss (1923-1996) was a Jewish woman who was born in Essen, a city in the industrial region of western Germany.

During World War II, she and her family faced deportation by the Gestapo. Marianne managed to escape and found refuge with members of a group called Bund. Society for Socialist Life, including Fritz and Maria Briel. She moved frequently to avoid detection and formed a close bond with the Briels. Marianne was eventually liberated by the U.S. Army in 1945.

As Germany's military situation worsened, Strauss fled to Düsseldorf, which fell to the US Army shortly thereafter. There, she met her future husband, Basil Ellenbogen who was a doctor and a Captain in the British Army attached to the occupying forces after World War II. They spent the rest of their lives in Liverpool. She worked as a teacher and also reported to the BBC on the rebuilding of Germany. Marianne died in 1996 and her account was published as a small article in a German journal. Her story was put together by historian Mark Roseman in his book about her, "The Past in Hiding".
