= Mirjam Katzin =

Swedish academic (born 1986)

- Born: 1986 (age 39–40); Jönköping, Sweden

Academic background
- Education: Lund University
- Thesis: Taking Care of Business: A Study of the Governing of Care Choice Systems in Swedish Home Care (2020)

Mirjam Katzin (born 1986 in Jönköping) is a Swedish politician, academic, and lawyer. She holds an LL.D. from Lund University. She currently serves as coordinator against antisemitism for Malmö Municipality, as well as a project leader at the Segerstedt Institute at the University of Gothenburg.

== Background ==
Katzin was born in 1986 in Jönköping, where she also grew up. She is Jewish, and in part due to antisemitism she was targeted with moved to Lund to finish her high school education, later settling in Malmö where she has lived since 2005.

== Work ==
Katzin published her doctoral thesis on the effects of the introduction of care choice systems in Sweden in October 2020. She works as a coordinator against antisemitism for Malmö Municipality. As part of this she has published two reports. In early 2021 she finished a report on antisemitism in Malmös kindergartens and schools. In November 2022 she authored a report on the everyday situation for Jewish residents of Malmö. She is currently project leader for the network Learning, prevention and consequences of antisemitism in the Swedish educational system at the Segerstedt Institute at the University of Gothenburg.

== Politics and activism ==
Katzin is a member of the Left Party, serving as chair of the Malmö section of the party from 2017 to 2019. She has also served on the municipal Culture Board for the party. She was one of the initiative takers to start a feminist festival in 2013, continuing to work for the festival until 2017. In 2014 she won that years equality award from Malmö Municipality for her work.
