= Albert Katzenellenbogen =

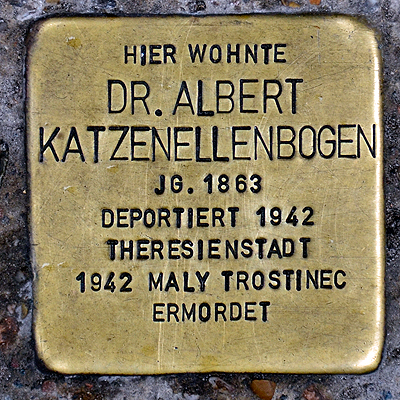
Memorial Stolperstein Neue Mainzer Str. 32 Katzenellenbogen Dr. Albert

Albert Katzenellenbogen (15 January 1863 – after August 1942, murdered near Minsk) was an important German legal advisor in banking and industry who was murdered in the Holocaust because of his Jewish heritage.

== Early life and career ==
Born on 15 August 1863 in Krotoszyn, Katzenellenbogen came from an influential German Jewish family whose origins are traced by American genealogist Neil Rosenstein as far back as the 15th century to Rabbi Meir Katzenellenbogen. He was married to Cornelia Josephine (Nelly) née Doctor. Since 1912 the couple lived in Königstein im Taunus in the "Oelmühlweg", where Albert Ullmann and Oskar Kohnstamm also lived as neighbors under the same address.

A lawyer by training, he was admitted to the bar in Frankfurt am Main in October 1891, and in July 1912 he was appointed a judicial councilor.

Katzenellenbogen served on the executive boards of banks, textile companies and chemical corporations in various German cities. He was chairman of the board of Mitteldeutsche Creditbank (Commerz- und Privat-Bank in Frankfurt), among others. In 1895, he became the bank's general counsel, in 1897 a member of the board of directors, and in 1903 a member of the board of management. After Commerzbank was founded, Katzenellenbogen was a member of its Board of Managing Directors from 1929 to 1930 and then of its supervisory board until 1937. One year before the bank was Aryanized, almost two thirds (64.5%) of Frankfurt bank mandates were approved by Jewish members of the supervisory board in which Katzenellenbogen was prominent.

== Nazi persecution ==
When the Nazis came to power in Germany in 1933, Katzenellenbogen was persecuted due to his Jewish heritage. He was forced out of his profession and positions, obliged to renounce his admission to the bar in October 1935. The property of the Katzenellenbogen family was aryanized in 1940.

His wife died on 19 April as a result of a stroke. Katzenellenbogen was deported from Frankfurt am Main to the Theresienstadt ghetto on 18 August 1942, and died in the Maly Trostinez Nazi extermination camp on 25 August 1942, on transport "Bc-942".

Katzenellenbogen's children were Grete Helene, Marta Sofie (1897–1984) and Adolf Katzenellenbogen (1901–1964). Adolf emigrated from Nazi Germany to America in 1939 and became the chairman of the department of fine arts at Johns Hopkins University. Grete Helene (1893–1944), daughter-in-law of Otto Berndt, did not escape and died as a forced laborer in Frankfurt am Main on 22 March 1944. The family grave is located in the main cemetery in Frankfurt. Among Katzenellenbogen's grandchildren is American professor of chemistry John Katzenellenbogen.

== Literature ==
- Heinz Sturm-Godramstein: Juden in Königstein. Leben-Bedeutung-Schicksale. Königstein im Taunus, 1983.
  - Hierin Anmerkung Nr. 25: Mitteilung von Herrn Dieter Berndt; ROSENSTEIN N.: The unbroken chain. New York 1976.

== See also ==
- The Holocaust
- German banks
- Aryanization
