= John Katzenellenbogen =

American biochemist

- Education: Harvard University, Harvard College
- Spouse: Benita Katzenellenbogen
- Awards: Guggenheim Fellowship (1977); Fred Conrad Koch Award (Benita Katzenellenbogen, 2016)

John Albert Katzenellenbogen (born May 10, 1944) is an American Professor of Chemistry at the University of Illinois at Urbana-Champaign. He studies the development of novel agents for the treatment of hormone-responsive and non-responsive breast and prostate cancers and the design of estrogens and antiestrogens that have a favorable balance of beneficial versus detrimental effects.

== Early life ==
John Katzenellenbogen was born May 10, 1944, in Poughkeepsie, New York. His parents taught at Vassar College, his father a professor of art history and his mother a pianist. His grandfather Albert Katzenellenbogen was a lawyer in Frankfurt, Germany who died in the Holocaust. In 1958, his family moved to Baltimore, Maryland, where his father Adolf Katzenellenbogen became Head of the Department of Art History at Johns Hopkins University and his mother joined the faculty at Peabody Conservatory and Goucher College. He began playing the cello at age 10. Katzenellenbogen attended Gilman School and held various summer jobs: in 1960, he worked at the Research Institute for Advanced Studies in the photosynthesis lab of Dr. Bessel Kok, and, in 1961, he was a General Electric Student Research Fellow at Union College in Schenectady, New York. As an undergraduate at Harvard, he majored in chemistry, going on to complete a PhD in chemistry in 1969 at Harvard under the direction of Dr. E. J. Corey.

== Career ==
Katzenellenbogen began his academic career as an Assistant Professor of Chemistry at the University of Illinois at Urbana-Champaign in 1969 and was promoted to Associate Professor in 1975 and to Full Professor in 1979. He was named the Roger Adams Professor and subsequently the chaired Swanlund Professor of Chemistry. He was one of the first academic chemists to work in the field of chemical biology. His major research efforts have focused on the study of steroid hormones and their biological receptors, the estrogen receptor in particular.

Katzenellenbogen's research is highly collaborative, and he works with other scientists locally, nationally, and internationally. He has published more than 550 articles and has trained over 130 PhD's and Postdoctoral Associates. He is a member of the American Association for the Advancement of Science and a fellow of the American Academy of Arts and Sciences, on whose National Council he served for many years. He has received numerous awards from scientific societies, including the Arthur C. Cope Scholar Award, the E. B. Hershberg Award for Important Discoveries in Medicinally Active Substances from the American Chemical Society, the Endocrine Society's Fred Conrad Koch Lifetime Achievement Award, which he shared with Dr. Benita Katzenellenbogen, and the Award for Outstanding Achievements in Chemistry in Cancer Research from the American Association for Cancer Research In 2018, Katzenellenbogen was inducted into the Medicinal Chemistry Hall of Fame of the American Chemical Society.

== Research ==
Katzenellenbogen developed the first affinity label for the estrogen receptor that was widely used to characterize its physical and biochemical properties, and he elucidated the metabolic activation of antiestrogens and characterized their sites of action. He also pioneered the development of positron emission tomography (PET) imaging agents for estrogen, androgen, and progesterone receptors. The PET imaging agents he developed, FES, FDHT, and FFNP, continue to be utilized to improve the prediction of patient response to endocrine therapy agents and to assist in the development of new cancer therapeutics. His more recent work is focused on developing novel antiestrogens effective against endocrine therapy-resistant forms of breast cancer and dissecting the mechanisms and signaling pathways that underlie the selective actions of estrogens in different target tissues.
