= Fred Conrad Koch =

American biochemist (1876–1948)

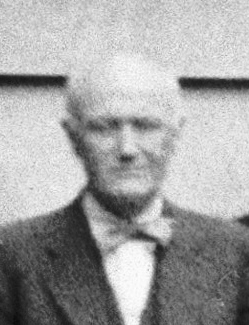
Fred Conrad Koch

Frederick Conrad Koch (May 16, 1876 – January 26, 1948) was an American biochemist and endocrinologist. Born in Chicago, Illinois, Koch graduated from the University of Illinois in 1899. He was affiliated with the University of Chicago from 1912 to 1941, serving as chairman of the department of biochemistry from 1936 to 1941. He retired as professor emeritus, and was director of biomedical research at Armour and Company. He was known primarily for his work on male sex hormones and testicular function. He served as the 19th president of the Endocrine Society, which in 1957 established the Fred Conrad Koch Lifetime Achievement Award, the society's highest honor.
