= Cornelis Hofstede de Groot =

Dutch art collector (1863–1930)

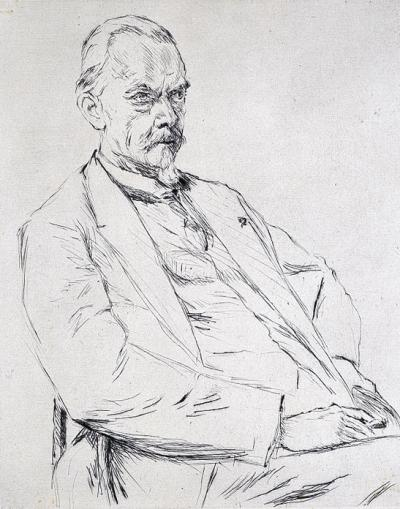
Hofstede de Groot by Max Liebermann, 1928

Cornelis Hofstede de Groot (9 November 1863 – 14 April 1930), was a Dutch art collector, art historian and museum curator.

== Biography ==
He was born in Dwingeloo and spent some time in Switzerland in his youth due to weak lungs, where he learned German. He became the first academically schooled art historian of the Netherlands, receiving his training in Leipzig, which is why much of his work was published in German.

He became an expert, who had many differences of opinion with Abraham Bredius and other art collectors, while serving various art institutions of the Netherlands, including the Frans Hals Museum, Gemeentemuseum Den Haag, and the RKD.

In 1893 he published a short article on Judith Leyster in the journal Jahrbuch der Königlich Preussischen Kunstsammlungen, thus "re-discovering" her work for the first time after centuries.

In 1896 he became director of the Rijksprentenkabinet —the Dutch national collection of prints, drawings, and photographs housed in the Amsterdam Rijksmuseum building— but he quit after two years because of a difference of opinion with his predecessor there. He then settled in The Hague as an independent art critic.

From 1912 to 1930 he lived in Haarlem, where he was a member of Teylers Tweede Genootschap.

From 1916 onwards he was a member of the Rijksmonument commission in the Netherlands.

== Literature work ==
In The Hague, he started to work on an eight-part book on Rembrandt with Wilhelm von Bode. His catalogue of his extensive collection of Rembrandt drawings was published in German by the Teylers Tweede Genootschap in their Verhandelingen of 1906. In 1910 he published a catalog of paintings by Frans Hals. He also wrote over 70 biographies of Dutch painters for the kunstenaarslexikon of Ulrich Thieme and Felix Becker.

=== Catalogue Raisonné ===
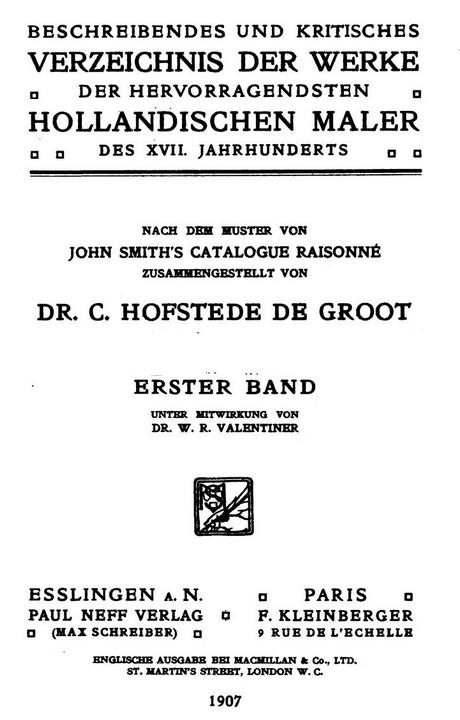
Title-page of the first volume in German in 1907

His most notable work is his lengthy 10-part Beschreibendes kritisches Verzeichnis der Werke der hervorragendsten Holländischen Mahler des XVII. Jahrhunderts (1907–28), also known as an update to John Smith's catalogue raisonné (9 vols.; 1829–42, London). He began this painstaking work in 1907 in German, but almost immediately took on the translator Edward G. Hawke to ensure publication in English. Unfortunately, Hofstede de Groot died before the translation of all volumes could be completed. The publications were (German date, followed in parentheses by the English date):

- Band 1 1907 (Volume 1 1908) : Jan Steen, Gabriel Metsu, Gerard Dou, Pieter de Hooch, Carel Fabritius, Johannes Vermeer of Delft, produced with assistance by W.R. Valentiner
- Band 2 1908 (Volume 2 1909) : Aelbert Cuyp, Philips Wouwerman, produced with assistance by Kurt Freise
- Band 3 1910 (Volume 3 1910) : Frans Hals, Adriaen van Ostade, Isaac van Ostade, Adriaen Brouwer, produced with assistance by Kurt Freise, Kurt Erasmus
- Band 4 1911 (Volume 4 1912) : Jacob van Ruysdael, Meindert Hobbema, Adriaen van de Velde, Paulus Potter, produced with assistance by Kurt Erasmus, W.R. Valentiner, Kurt Freise
- Band 5 1912 (Volume 5 1913) : Gerard ter Borch, Caspar Netscher, Godfried Schalcken, Pieter van Slingeland, Eglon Hendrik van der Neer, produced with assistance by Eduard Plietzsch, Karl Lilienfeld
- Band 6 1914 (Volume 6 1916) : Rembrandt, Nicolaes Maes, produced with assistance by Karl Lilienfeld, Heinrich Wichmann Kurt Erasmus
- Band 7 1918 (Volume 7 1923) : Willem van de Velde, Johannes van de Capelle, Ludolf Bakhuyzen, Aert van der Neer, produced with assistance by Karl Lilienfeld, Otto Hirschmann
- Band 8 1923 (Volume 8 1927) : Jan van Goyen, Jan van der Heyden, Johannes Wijnants, produced with assistance by O. Hirschmann, H. Kauffmann, W. Stechow
- Band 9 1926 (German only) : Johannes Hackaert, Nicolaes Berchem, Karel du Jardin, Jan Both, Adam Pijnacker, produced with assistance by O. Hirschmann, W. Stechow, K. Bauch
- Band 10 1928 (German only) : Frans van Mieris, Willem van Mieris, Adriaen van der Werff, Rachel Ruysch, Jan van Huysum, produced with assistance by Elisabeth Neurdenburg, O. Hirschmann, K. Bauch
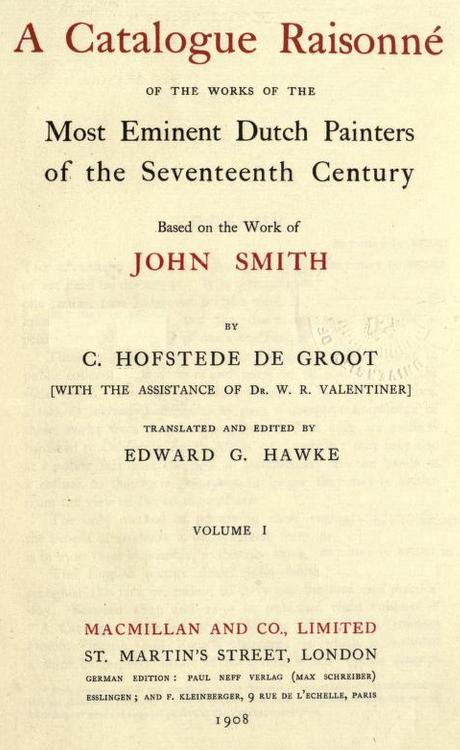

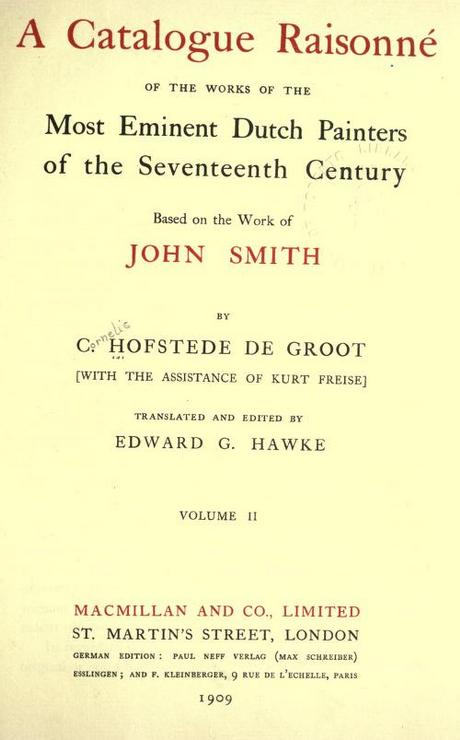

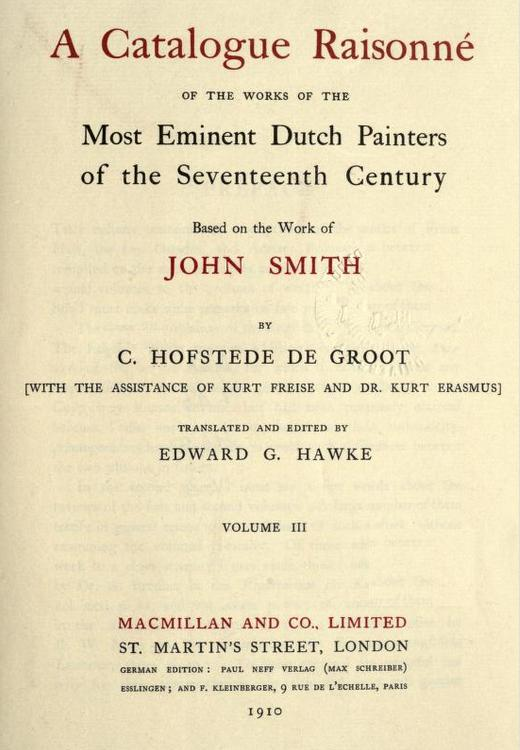

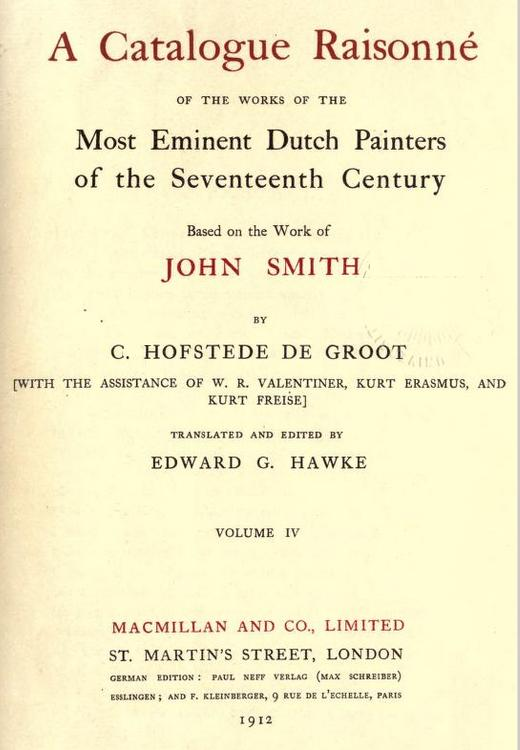

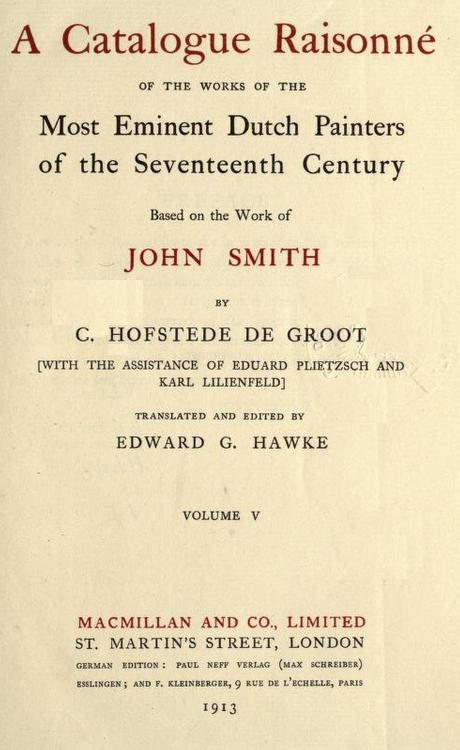

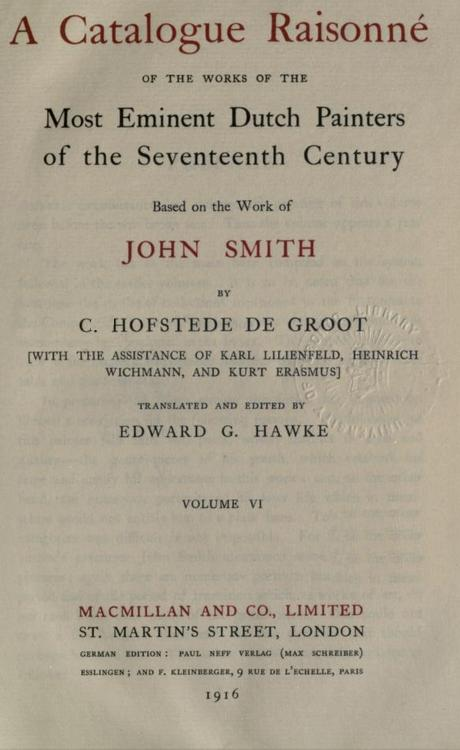
