= Simiolus (journal) =

- Discipline: Art history
- Language: English

Publication details
- History: 1966-present
- Publisher: Stichting Nederlandse Kunsthistorische Publicaties (Netherlands)
- Frequency: Biannually

Standard abbreviations
- ISO 4: Simiolus

Indexing
- ISSN: 0037-5411

Links
- Journal homepage

Simiolus: Journal for the History of Art is a Dutch academic journal that publishes articles in English on art and art history, especially Dutch and Flemish art from the fifteenth to the seventeenth century. The journal was founded in 1966 at Utrecht University and currently appears twice a year (June and December), now courtesy of the Stichting Nederlandse Kunsthistorische Publicaties. Until 2024, the journal was published under the title Simiolus: Netherlands Quarterly for the History of Art.

In 1989, conceptual artist Michael Asher used Simiolus as the site for his contribution to Conceptual Art: A Perspective at Musée d’Art Moderne de la Ville de Paris. Invited by the museum to contribute a piece to the exhibit, Asher instead opted to place unauthored advertisements for the museum show in Simiolus, along with several other European art-historical journals, commenting on the way that art history is produced.
