= Kurt Bauch =

German art historian (1897-1975)

Kurt Bauch (25 November 1897, Neustadt-Glewe – 1 March 1975, Freiburg im Breisgau) was a German art historian with particular interest in the art of Rembrandt.

Bauch, son of a Mecklenburg judge, studied art history at the Friedrich Wilhelm University of Berlin under Adolph Goldschmidt and at the Ludwig-Maximilians-Universität München under Heinrich Wölfflin. He wrote his Ph.D. dissertation on the Rembrandt pupil, Jacob Adriaensz Backer, at the University of Freiburg under Hans Jantzen. From 1924 to 1926, he was assistant of the famous Dutch Rembrandt scholar, Cornelis Hofstede de Groot in The Hague. In 1927, he completed his Habilitationsschrift on the art of the young Rembrandt. For some years he worked as a Privatdozent, teaching medieval and early modern art at the University of Freiburg and the University of Frankfurt am Main. After joining the Nazi Party in 1933, he was appointed professor of art history at the University of Freiburg, where he retired in 1962.

== Select publications ==
- Jakob Adriaensz Backer: ein Rembrandtbschüler aus Friesland. Berlin 1926.
- Die Kunst des jungen Rembrandt. Heidelberg 1933.
- Über die Herkunft der Gotik. Freiburg im Breisgau 1939.
- Strassburg. Berlin 1941.
- Der Isenheimer Altar. Königstein im Taunus 1951.
- Abendländische Kunst. Düsseldorf 1952.
- Freiburg im Breisgau. Munich 1953.
- Der frühe Rembrandt und seine Zeit: Studien zur geschichtlichen Bedeutung seines Frühstils. Berlin 1960.
- Deutsche Kultur am Kap - German culture at the Cape - Duitse kultuur aan die Kaap. Cape Town 1964.
- Rembrandt: Gemälde. Berlin 1966.
- Das Brandenburger Tor. Cologne 1966.
- Studien zur Kunstgeschichte. Berlin 1967.
- Das mittelalterliche Grabbild. Figürliche Grabmäler des 11. bis 15. Jahrhunderts in Europa. Berlin 1976.
