= Bogen =

Bogen may refer to:

== Places ==
Germany

- Bogen, Germany, a town in the district of Straubing-Bogen, Bavaria
- Straubing-Bogen, a district in Bavaria
- Hoher Bogen, a mountain range in Bavaria
- Landkreis Bogen, a former Landkreis in Niederbayern

Kazakhstan

- Bogen (river), a river in the Turkistan Region
- Bogen Dam, a dam across the Bogen River

Norway

- Bogen, Evenes, a village in Evenes municipality, Nordland
  - Bogen Chapel (Evenes), a chapel in the village of Bogen in Evenes
- Bogen, Steigen, a village in Steigen municipality, Nordland
  - Bogen Chapel (Steigen), a chapel in the village of Bogen in Steigen
- Bogen (Austra), a hamlet on Austra island, Nordland

South Georgia

- Bogen Glacier, a glacier on South Georgia island

== Other uses ==
- Bogen (surname), a surname
- Bogen Imaging, the US distributor of photographic products made by Italian manufacturer Manfrotto Group
- Bogen Communications, an audio electronics company based in Ramsey, New Jersey

== See also ==
- Bogan (disambiguation)
