= Jangal, Rask =

Village in Sistan and Baluchestan province, Iran

Jangal Persian: جنگل
- Village
- Location within Iran
- Coordinates: 26°18′15″N 61°22′26″E
- Country: Iran
- Province: Sistan and Baluchestan
- County: Rask
- District: Parud
- Rural District: Parud

Population (2016)
  - Total: 3,071
- Time zone: UTC+3:30 (IRST)

Jangal (Persian: جنگل) is a village in Parud Rural District of Parud District, Rask County, (Note: Formerly Sarbaz County) Sistan and Baluchestan province, Iran.

== Demographics ==
=== Population ===
At the time of the 2006 National Census, the village's population was 2,381 in 453 households, when it was in the Central District of Sarbaz County. The following census in 2011 counted 2,813 people in 597 households, by which time the rural district had been separated from the district in the formation of Parud District. The 2016 census measured the population of the village as 3,071 people in 709 households. It was the most populous village in its rural district.

After the census, the district was separated from the county in the establishment of Rask County.
