= Jakigur =

Village in Sistan and Baluchestan province, Iran

Jakigur Persian: جکيگور
- Village
- Location within Iran
- Coordinates: 26°07′38″N 61°30′53″E
- Country: Iran
- Province: Sistan and Baluchestan
- County: Rask
- District: Central
- Rural District: Jakigur

Population (2016)
  - Total: 4,611
- Time zone: UTC+3:30 (IRST)

Jakigur (Persian: جکيگور) is a village in, and the capital of, Jakigur Rural District of the Central District of Rask County, (Note: Formerly Sarbaz County) Sistan and Baluchestan province, Iran.

== Demographics ==
=== Population ===
At the time of the 2006 National Census, the village's population was 3,160 in 644 households, when it was in Pishin District, Sarbaz County. The following census in 2011 counted 4,181 people in 933 households, by which time the rural district had been transferred to the Central District. The 2016 census measured the population of the village as 4,611 people in 1,230 households. It was the most populous village in its rural district.

After the census, the rural district was separated from the county in the establishment of Rask County and transferred to the new Central District.
