= Machan, Sarbaz =

Village in Sistan and Baluchestan province, Iran

Machan Persian: مچان
- Village
- Location within Iran
- Coordinates: 26°32′04″N 61°00′18″E
- Country: Iran
- Province: Sistan and Baluchestan
- County: Sarbaz
- District: Kishkur
- Rural District: Machan

Population (2016)
  - Total: 377
- Time zone: UTC+3:30 (IRST)

Machan (Persian: مچان) is a village in, and the capital of, Machan Rural District of Kishkur District, Sarbaz County, Sistan and Baluchestan province, Iran.

== Demographics ==
=== Population ===
At the time of the 2006 National Census, the village's population was 170 in 39 households, when it was in Kishkur Rural District of the former Sarbaz District. The following census in 2011 counted 80 people in 18 households. The 2016 census measured the population of the village as 377 people in 102 households.

In September 2018, the rural district was separated from the district in the formation of Kishkur District, and Machan was transferred to Machan Rural District created in the new district.
