= Kazur =

Village in Sistan and Baluchestan province, Iran

Kazur Persian: کزور
- Village
- Location within Iran
- Coordinates: 26°32′27″N 61°37′34″E
- Country: Iran
- Province: Sistan and Baluchestan
- County: Sarbaz
- District: Minan
- Rural District: Kazur

Population (2016)
  - Total: 511
- Time zone: UTC+3:30 (IRST)

Kazur (Persian: کزور) is a village in, and the capital of Kazur Rural District of Minan District, Sarbaz County, Sistan and Baluchestan province, Iran.

== Demographics ==
=== Population ===
At the time of the 2006 National Census, the village's population was 692 in 152 households, when it was in Minan Rural District of the former Sarbaz District. The following census in 2011 counted 697 people in 142 households. The 2016 census measured the population of the village as 511 people in 145 households.

In 2018, the rural district was separated from the district in the formation of Minan District, and Kazur was transferred to Kazur Rural District created in the district.
