= Zardban =

Village in Sistan and Baluchestan province, Iran

Zardban Persian: زردبن
- Village
- Location within Iran
- Coordinates: 25°53′13″N 61°46′58″E
- Country: Iran
- Province: Sistan and Baluchestan
- County: Rask
- District: Pishin
- Rural District: Zardban

Population (2016)
  - Total: 1,311
- Time zone: UTC+3:30 (IRST)

Zardban (Persian: زردبن) is a village in, and the capital of, Zardban Rural District of Pishin District, Rask County, (Note: Formerly Sarbaz County) Sistan and Baluchestan province, Iran.

== Demographics ==
=== Population ===
At the time of the 2006 National Census, the village's population was 1,146 in 208 households, when it was in Pishin Rural District of Sarbaz County. The following census in 2011 counted 1,544 people in 319 households, by which time the village had been transferred to Zardban Rural District created in the district. The 2016 census measured the population of the village as 1,311 people in 311 households. It was the most populous village in its rural district.

After the census, the district was separated from the county in the establishment of Rask County.
