= Firuzabad, Rask =

Village in Sistan and Baluchestan province, Iran

Firuzabad Persian: فیروزآباد
- Village
- Location within Iran
- Coordinates: 26°17′13″N 61°25′10″E
- Country: Iran
- Province: Sistan and Baluchestan
- County: Rask
- District: Central
- Rural District: Rask and Firuzabad

Population (2016)
  - Total: 2,323
- Time zone: UTC+3:30 (IRST)

Firuzabad (Persian: فیروزآباد) is a village in Rask and Firuzabad Rural District of the Central District of Rask County, (Note: Formerly Sarbaz County) Sistan and Baluchestan province, Iran.

== Demographics ==
=== Population ===
At the time of the 2006 National Census, the village's population was 2,163 in 390 households, when it was in the Central District of Sarbaz County. The following census in 2011 counted 2,286 people in 487 households. The 2016 census measured the population of the village as 2,323 people in 531 households. It was the most populous village in its rural district.

After the census, the rural district was separated from the county in the establishment of Rask County and transferred to the new Central District.
