= Nasirabad, Sistan and Baluchestan =

Village in Sistan and Baluchestan province, Iran

Nasirabad Persian: نصیرآباد
- Village
- Location within Iran
- Coordinates: 26°29′09″N 61°12′49″E
- Country: Iran
- Province: Sistan and Baluchestan
- County: Sarbaz
- District: Central
- Rural District: Sarbaz

Population (2016)
  - Total: 1,462
- Time zone: UTC+3:30 (IRST)

Nasirabad (Persian: نصیرآباد) is a village in Sarbaz Rural District of the Central District of Sarbaz County, Sistan and Baluchestan province, Iran.

== Demographics ==
=== Population ===
At the time of the 2006 National Census, the village's population was 1,396 in 291 households, when it was in the former Sarbaz District. The following census in 2011 counted 1,097 people in 278 households. The 2016 census measured the population of the village as 1,462 people in 366 households. It was the most populous village in its rural district.

Sarbaz Rural District was transferred to the Central District in 2018.
