= Kachdar =

Village in Sistan and Baluchestan province, Iran

Kachdar Persian: کچدر
- Village
- Location within Iran
- Coordinates: 26°37′34″N 61°14′25″E
- Country: Iran
- Province: Sistan and Baluchestan
- County: Sarbaz
- District: Central
- Rural District: Sarbaz

Population (2016)
  - Total: 1,357
- Time zone: UTC+3:30 (IRST)

Kachdar (Persian: کچدر) is a village in, and the capital of, Sarbaz Rural District of the Central District of Sarbaz County, Sistan and Baluchestan province, Iran.

== Demographics ==
=== Population ===
At the time of the 2006 National Census, the village's population was 1,269 in 247 households, when it was in the former Sarbaz District. The following census in 2011 counted 1,361 people in 238 households. The 2016 census measured the population of the village as 1,357 people in 332 households.

Sarbaz Rural District was transferred to the Central District in 2018.
