= Murtan, Rask =

Village in Sistan and Baluchestan province, Iran

Murtan Persian: مورتان
- Village
- Location within Iran
- Coordinates: 26°25′48″N 61°45′45″E
- Country: Iran
- Province: Sistan and Baluchestan
- County: Rask
- District: Parud
- Rural District: Murtan

Population (2016)
  - Total: 1,348
- Time zone: UTC+3:30 (IRST)

Murtan (Persian: مورتان) is a village in, and the capital of, Murtan Rural District of Parud District, Rask County, (Note: Formerly Sarbaz County) Sistan and Baluchestan province, Iran.

== Demographics ==
=== Population ===
At the time of the 2006 National Census, the village's population was 998 in 184 households, when it was in the Central District of Sarbaz County. The following census in 2011 counted 1,167 people in 253 households, by which time the rural district had been separated from the district in the formation of Parud District. The 2016 census measured the population of the village as 1,348 people in 302 households. It was the most populous village in its rural district.

After the census, the district was separated from the county in the establishment of Rask County.
