= Hajjiabad, Kishkur =

Village in Sistan and Baluchestan province, Iran

Hajjiabad Persian: حاجی‌آباد
- Village
- Location within Iran
- Coordinates: 26°30′37″N 61°09′24″E
- Country: Iran
- Province: Sistan and Baluchestan
- County: Sarbaz
- District: Kishkur
- Rural District: Kishkur

Population (2016)
  - Total: 1,792
- Time zone: UTC+3:30 (IRST)

Hajjiabad (Persian: حاجی‌آباد) is a village in Kishkur Rural District of Kishkur District, Sarbaz County, Sistan and Baluchestan province, Iran.

== Demographics ==
=== Population ===
At the time of the 2006 National Census, the village's population was 1,651 in 295 households, when it was in the former Sarbaz District. The following census in 2011 counted 1,553 people in 344 households. The 2016 census measured the population of the village as 1,792 people in 443 households. It was the most populous village in its rural district.

The rural district was separated from the district in the formation of Kishkur District in 2018.
