= Murtan =

Murtan (Persian: مورتان) may refer to:

- Murtan, Iranshahr
- Murtan, Rask
- Murtan Rural District, in Sarbaz County
