= Suldan, Rask =

Village in Sistan and Baluchestan province, Iran

Suldan Persian: سولدان
- Village
- Location within Iran
- Coordinates: 26°09′13″N 61°47′12″E
- Country: Iran
- Province: Sistan and Baluchestan
- County: Rask
- District: Pishin
- Rural District: Pishin

Population (2016)
  - Total: 723
- Time zone: UTC+3:30 (IRST)

Suldan (Persian: سولدان) is a village in Pishin Rural District of Pishin District, Rask County, (Note: Formerly Sarbaz County) Sistan and Baluchestan, Iran.

== Demographics ==
=== Population ===
At the time of the 2006 National Census, the village's population was 941, in 177 households; at that time, it was part of Sarbaz County. The 2011 census counted 582 people in 115 households. The 2016 census measured the population as 723 people in 174 households, making it the most populous village in its rural district.

After the census, the district was separated from the county to establish Rask County.
