= Machkur =

Village in Sistan and Baluchestan province, Iran

Machkur Persian: مچ کور
- Village
- Location within Iran
- Coordinates: 26°47′17″N 61°02′56″E
- Country: Iran
- Province: Sistan and Baluchestan
- County: Sarbaz
- District: Central
- Rural District: Sarkur

Population (2016)
  - Total: 576
- Time zone: UTC+3:30 (IRST)

Machkur (Persian: مچ کور) is a village in, and the capital of, Sarkur Rural District of the Central District of Sarbaz County, Sistan and Baluchestan province, Iran.

== Demographics ==
=== Population ===
At the time of the 2006 National Census, the village's population was 475 in 72 households, when it was in the former Sarbaz District. The following census in 2011 counted 519 people in 127 households. The 2016 census measured the population of the village as 576 people in 145 households.

Sarkur Rural District was transferred to the Central District in 2018.
