= Kafeh-ye Balochi =

Village in Sistan and Baluchestan province, Iran

Kafeh-ye Balochi Persian: کافه بلوچی
- Village
- Location within Iran
- Coordinates: 26°44′34″N 61°33′48″E
- Country: Iran
- Province: Sistan and Baluchestan
- County: Sarbaz
- District: Naskand
- Rural District: Balochi

Population (2016)
  - Total: 1,975
- Time zone: UTC+3:30 (IRST)

Kafeh-ye Balochi (Persian: کافه بلوچی) is a village in, and the capital of, Balochi Rural District of Naskand District, Sarbaz County, Sistan and Baluchestan province, Iran.

== Demographics ==
=== Population ===
At the time of the 2006 National Census, the village's population was 948 in 192 households, when it was in Naskand Rural District of the former Sarbaz District. The following census in 2011 counted 1,520 people in 337 households. The 2016 census measured the population of the village as 1,975 people in 441 households. It was the most populous village in Naskand Rural District.

In September 2018, the rural district was separated from the district in the formation of Naskand District, and Kafeh-ye Balochi was transferred to Balochi Rural District created in the new district.
