= Balochi Rural District =

Rural district in Sistan and Baluchestan province, Iran

Balochi Rural District Persian: دهستان بلوچی
- Rural District
- Location within Iran
- Coordinates: 26°38′16″N 61°33′02″E
- Country: Iran
- Province: Sistan and Baluchestan
- County: Sarbaz
- District: Naskand
- Capital: Kafeh-ye Balochi
- Time zone: UTC+3:30 (IRST)

Balochi Rural District (Persian: دهستان بلوچی) is in Naskand District of Sarbaz County, Sistan and Baluchestan province, Iran. Its capital is the village of Kafeh-ye Balochi, whose population at the time of the 2016 National Census was 1,975 in 441 households.

== History ==
In 2018, Naskand Rural District was separated from Sarbaz District in the formation of Naskand District, and Balochi Rural District was created in the new district.
