= Padik =

Village in Sistan and Baluchestan province, Iran

Padik Persian: پادیک
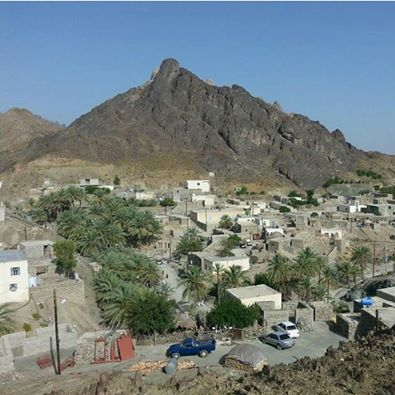
- The village of Padik

- Location in Iran
- Coordinates: 26°39′36″N 61°03′51″E
- Country: Iran
- Province: Sistan and Baluchestan
- County: Sarbaz
- District: Central
- Rural District: Sarkur

Population (2016)
  - Total: 796
- Time zone: UTC+3:30 (IRST)

Padik (Persian: پادیک) is a village in Sarkur Rural District of the Central District of Sarbaz County, Sistan and Baluchestan province, Iran.

== Demographics ==
=== Population ===
At the time of the 2006 National Census, the village's population was 501 in 105 households, when it was in the former Sarbaz District. The following census in 2011 counted 648 people in 137 households. The 2016 census measured the population of the village as 796 people in 144 households. It was the most populous village in its rural district.

Sarkur Rural District was transferred to the Central District in 2018.
