= Raisabad, Sistan and Baluchestan =

Village in Sistan and Baluchestan province, Iran

Raisabad Persian: رئیس‌آباد
- Village
- Location within Iran
- Coordinates: 26°29′23″N 61°04′55″E
- Country: Iran
- Province: Sistan and Baluchestan
- County: Sarbaz
- District: Kishkur
- Rural District: Kishkur

Population (2016)
  - Total: 465
- Time zone: UTC+3:30 (IRST)

Raisabad (Persian: رئیس‌آباد) is a village in Kishkur Rural District of Kishkur District, Sarbaz County, Sistan and Baluchestan province, Iran, serving as capital of both the district and the rural district.

== Demographics ==
=== Population ===
At the time of the 2006 National Census, the village's population was 458 in 95 households, when it was in the former Sarbaz District. The following census in 2011 counted 467 people in 108 households. The 2016 census measured the population of the village as 465 people in 127 households.

The rural district was separated from the district in the formation of Kishkur District in 2018.
