= Bogan-e Bala, Iran =

Bogan, Baluchestan
- town
- Location within Iran
- Coordinates: 26°37′51″N 61°15′24″E
- Country: Iran
- Province: Sistan and Baluchestan
- County: Sarbaz
- Bakhsh: Sarbaz
- Elevation: 553 m (1,814 ft)
- Time zone: UTC+3:30 (IRST)
  - Summer (DST): UTC+4:30 (IRDT)

Bogan-e Bala is a village in Baluchistan, Iran.

It is located midway between Iranshahr and the Pakistan border at an elevation of 553 meters above sea level and is on highway 95. The terrain is arid and mountainous.

The village is 5km east of Sarbaz the county town of Sarbaz District is, situated on the west side of a wadi, and looks across to the adjoining village of Bogan, Baluchistan (also known as Bojan) which is at an altitude of 939 meters.

A third village, Bogan-e Pa'in is located on the main road east, about 1 km to the south of the other two villages, in a location near the head of the wadi. Bogan-e Pa'in in Sīstān va Balūchestān, is a town, and has a primary school.
