= Bogen (surname) =

Bogen is a surname. Notable people with the surname include:

- Albert Bogen (1882–1961), Austrian fencer
- Alexander Bogen (1916–2010), Polish-Israeli artist
- Bjarne Bogen (born 1951), Norwegian immunologist
- Boris D. Bogen (1869–1929), Russian-American educator and social worker
- Debra Bogen, American pediatrician and public health official
- James Bogen, American science philosopher
- Joel Bogen, English guitarist
- Joseph Bogen, American neurophysiologist
- Nancy Bogen, American scholar, author, and artist
- Øystein Bogen (born 1969), Norgwegian journalist and documentary filmmaker
- Paul Logasa Bogen, United States Army officer
- Rico Bogen, German triathlete

== Bogen as beginning in compound surnames ==
- Ariela Bogenberger (born 1962) German screenwriter and producer
- Mattie Bogenrief (1912–1971) American politician

== See also ==
- Erna Bogen-Bogáti, Hungarian fencer
- Bogan (surname)
