= Kazur Rural District =

Rural district in Sistan and Baluchestan province, Iran

Kazur Rural District Persian: دهستان کزور
- Rural District
- Location within Iran
- Coordinates: 26°32′17″N 61°36′27″E
- Country: Iran
- Province: Sistan and Baluchestan
- County: Sarbaz
- District: Minan
- Capital: Kazur
- Time zone: UTC+3:30 (IRST)

Kazur Rural District (Persian: دهستان کزور) is in Minan District of Sarbaz County, Sistan and Baluchestan province, Iran. Its capital is the village of Kazur, whose population at the time of the 2016 National Census was 511 in 145 households.

== History ==
In 2018, Minan Rural District was separated from Sarbaz District in the formation of Minan District, and Kazur was transferred to Kazur Rural District created in the new district.
