= Boggan (disambiguation) =

The term boggan may refer to:

- Boggan, a species in the role-playing game Changeling: The Dreaming
- Jimmy Boggan (1938—2009), mentor for the Dublin hurling team
- Tim Boggan, table tennis player, USA Table Tennis Hall of Fame member, part of the Ping Pong Diplomacy exchange program
- Rex Boggan (1930—1985), American football player

== See also ==
- Boggan-Hammond House and Alexander Little Wing, historic home located at Wadesboro, Anson County, North Carolina.
- Toboggan (disambiguation)
- Bogan (disambiguation)
