= Sarbaz Castle =

Castle in Sistan and Baluchestan Province, Iran

- قلعه سرباز
- Interactive map of the Sarbaz Castle area

General information
- Type: Castle
- Location: Sarbaz, Iran

Sarbaz Castle (Persian: قلعه سرباز) is a historical castle located in Sarbaz County in Sistan and Baluchestan Province, The longevity of this fortress dates back to the Qajar dynasty.
