= Parud, Rask =

City in Sistan and Baluchestan province, Iran

Parud Persian: پارود
- City
- Location within Iran
- Coordinates: 26°22′03″N 61°17′29″E
- Country: Iran
- Province: Sistan and Baluchestan
- County: Rask
- District: Parud

Population (2016)
  - Total: 2,997
- Time zone: UTC+3:30 (IRST)

Parud (Persian: پارود) is a city in, and the capital of, Parud District of Rask County, (Note: Formerly Sarbaz County) Sistan and Baluchestan province, Iran. It also serves as the administrative center for Parud Rural District.

== Demographics ==
=== Population ===
At the time of the 2006 National Census, Parud's population was 2,841 in 584 households, when it was a village in Parud Rural District of the Central District of Sarbaz County. The following census in 2011 counted 3,128 people in 693 households, by which time the rural district had been separated from the district in the formation of Parud District. The 2016 census measured the population of the village as 2,997 people in 751 households.

After the census, the district was separated from the county in the establishment of Rask County and the village of Parud was elevated to the status of city.
