= Machan Rural District =

Rural district in Sistan and Baluchestan province, Iran

Machan Rural District Persian: دهستان مچان
- Rural District
- Location within Iran
- Coordinates: 26°28′36″N 60°56′46″E
- Country: Iran
- Province: Sistan and Baluchestan
- County: Sarbaz
- District: Kishkur
- Capital: Machan
- Time zone: UTC+3:30 (IRST)

Machan Rural District (Persian: دهستان مچان) is in Kishkur District of Sarbaz County, Sistan and Baluchestan province, Iran. Its capital is the village of Machan, whose population at the time of the 2016 National Census was 377 in 102 households.

== History ==
In 2018, Kishkur Rural District was separated from the former Sarbaz District in the formation of Kishkur District, and Machan Rural District was created in the new district.
