= Naskand =

Village in Sistan and Baluchestan province, Iran

Naskand Persian: نسکند
- Village
- Location within Iran
- Coordinates: 26°42′06″N 61°27′35″E
- Country: Iran
- Province: Sistan and Baluchestan
- County: Sarbaz
- District: Naskand
- Rural District: Naskand

Population (2016)
  - Total: 802
- Time zone: UTC+3:30 (IRST)

Naskand (Persian: نسکند) is a village in Naskand Rural District of Naskand District, Sarbaz County, Sistan and Baluchestan province, Iran, serving as capital of both the district and the rural district.

== Demographics ==
=== Population ===
At the time of the 2006 National Census, the village's population was 784 in 151 households, when it was in the former Sarbaz District. The following census in 2011 counted 981 people in 199 households. The 2016 census measured the population of the village as 802 people in 205 households.

The rural district was separated from the district in the formation of Naskand District in 2018.
