= Batak, Iran =

Village in Sistan and Baluchestan province, Iran

Batak Persian: باتک
- Village
- Location within Iran
- Coordinates: 26°38′33″N 61°23′08″E
- Country: Iran
- Province: Sistan and Baluchestan
- County: Sarbaz
- District: Minan
- Rural District: Minan

Population (2016)
  - Total: 2,192
- Time zone: UTC+3:30 (IRST)

Batak (Persian: باتک) is a village in Minan Rural District of Minan District, Sarbaz County, Sistan and Baluchestan province, Iran, serving as capital of both the district and the rural district.

== Demographics ==
=== Population ===
At the time of the 2006 National Census, the village's population was 2,196 in 427 households, when it was in the former Sarbaz District. The following census in 2011 counted 2,057 people in 440 households. The 2016 census measured the population of the village as 2,192 people in 533 households. It was the most populous village in its rural district.

The rural district was separated from the district in the formation of Minan District in 2018.
