= Bogan (surname) =

Bogan is a surname. It is from ÓBoughain—a Cinel mBinnigh sept in Donegal and Waterford. Variations of Bogan are Boggon and Boggan. Bogan originated from Ireland. Bog means soft land.

Notable people with the surname include:

- Ann Bogan (born 1941), American singer
- Dan Bogan (born 1860), American gunfighter and outlaw of the Old West
- Gerald F. Bogan (1894–1973), US Navy aviator and vice admiral
- Louise Bogan (1897–1970), American poet
- Lucille Bogan (1897–1948), American blues singer
- Ralph Bogan (1922–2013), American businessman
- Ronald E. Bogan, African-American gay police officer
- Ted Bogan (1909–1990), American country blues guitarist, singer and songwriter
- Tommy Bogan (1920–1993), Scottish footballer
- William J. Bogan (1870–1936), American educator
- Zachary Bogan (1625–1659), English theologian

== Fictional characters ==
- Elias Bogan, character from the X-Men comics series

== See also ==
- Bogan (disambiguation)
- Bogen (surname)
