= Ordabasy District =

Coordinates: 42.5947°N 69.2556°E

Ordabasy Ордабасы
- District
- Ордабасы ауданы
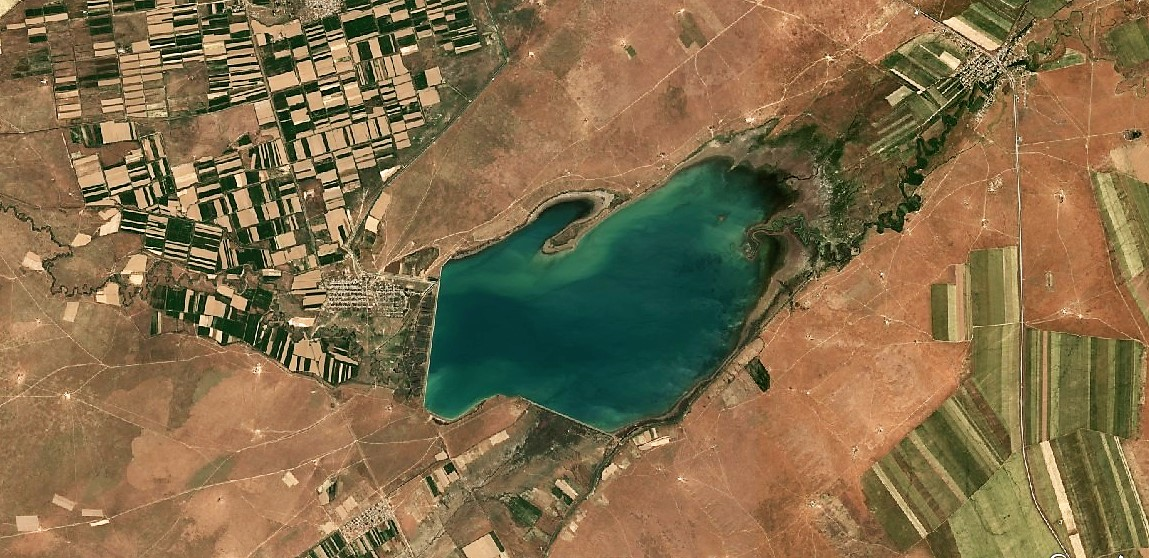
- Bogen Reservoir Sentinel-2 image.

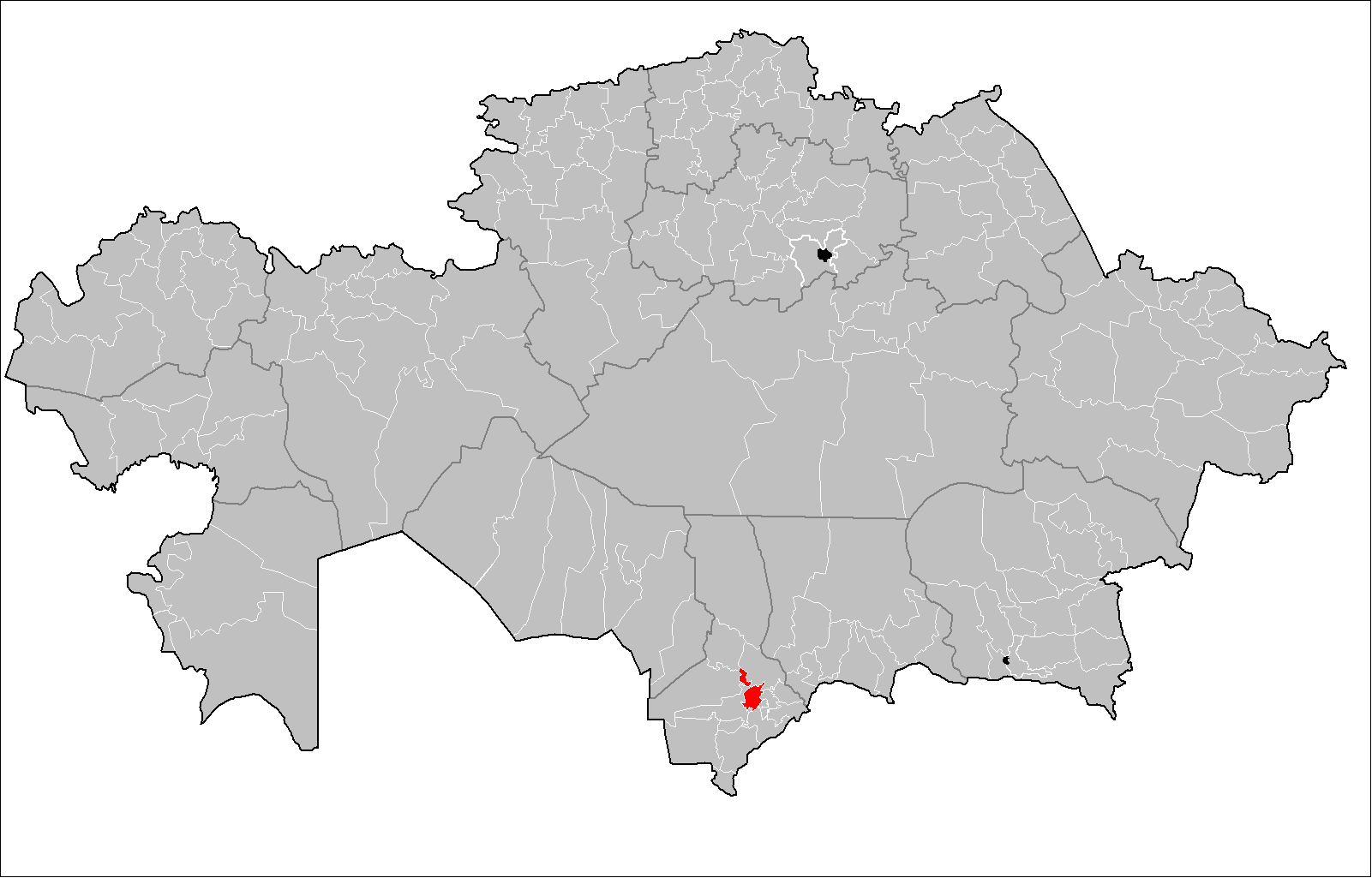
- Country: Kazakhstan
- Region: Turkistan Region
- Administrative center: Temirlan

Government
  - Akim: Azat Oralbayev

Population (2013)
  - Total: 114,203
- Time zone: UTC+6 (East)

Ordabasy (Kazakh: Ордабасы ауданы, Ordabasy audany) is a district of Turkistan Region in southern Kazakhstan. The administrative center of the district is the selo of Temirlan. Population: 114,203 (2013 estimate); 102,875 (2009 census results); 80,799 (1999 census results).

== Geography ==
The Bogen Dam is located in the lower course of the Bogen River, in the central part of the district.
