= List of Iranian drone bases =

This is a List of Iranian drone bases, containing military bases from which Iran operates unmanned aerial vehicles.

Base, location	Operation dates	Operations	Notes
Bandar Abbas 27°12′18.9396″N 56°22′0.804″E	Since 10 January 2016		The Drone Center at Bard College in NY
Chabahar Konarak Airport 25°19′55″N 60°21′23″E	Since 12 November 2014		
Choghadak Airfield in Bushehr County within Bushehr Province 28°58′37.7″N 50°59′44.466″E	Since 4 June 2019		
Gonabad Airfield 34°25′15″N 58°42′16″E	Since 18 June 2019		
Hamadan Air Base 35°12′42″N 48°39′12″E	Since 2017	Mohajer-4 base	
Jakigur 26°8′42.4212″N 61°30′46.7929″E	Since 11 December 2015		
Jask Airport 25°39′13″N 57°47′57″E	Since 27 January 2015		
Kashan Airport 33°53′43″N 51°34′37″E	Since 26 September 2018	Test site	
Kushke Nosrat Airport 34°59′02″N 50°48′22″E	Since 25 June 2019	Training School	
Marjan Airstrip 34°15′06″N 45°49′57″E	Since 2017		
Minab 27°6′10.0692″N 57°5′8.9268″E	Since 19 October 2013		
16 km SE (by car) from Qeshm International Airport 26°42′32″N 55°57′35″E	Since 25 October 2014		
Semnan 35°23′46.61″N 53°39′50.66″E	Since 1 October 2018		

== Abroad ==
Country	Base, location	Operation dates	Operations	Notes
Iraq	Kirkuk 35°27′19.9692″N 44°21′28.6164″E	Since 2018		
Syria	T-4 Tiyas Military Airbase 34°31′21″N 37°37′47″E	Since 2012		
Yemen	Houthi movement controls Sanaa 15°28′35″N 044°13′11″E	Since 30 July 2021	Mercer Street tanker ship	List of airports in Yemen
