= Sarbaz Rural District =

Rural district in Sistan and Baluchestan province, Iran

Sarbaz Rural District Persian: دهستان سرباز
- Rural District
- Location within Iran
- Coordinates: 26°34′23″N 61°14′35″E
- Country: Iran
- Province: Sistan and Baluchestan
- County: Sarbaz
- District: Central
- Capital: Kachdar

Population (2016)
  - Total: 28,306
- Time zone: UTC+3:30 (IRST)

Sarbaz Rural District (Persian: دهستان سرباز) is in the Central District of Sarbaz County, Sistan and Baluchestan province, Iran. Its capital is the village of Kachdar.

== Demographics ==
=== Population ===
At the time of the 2006 National Census, the rural district's population (as a part of the former Sarbaz District) was 24,374 in 4,638 households. There were 16,628 inhabitants in 3,539 households at the following census of 2011. The 2016 census measured the population of the rural district as 28,306 in 7,129 households. The most populous of its 84 villages was Nasirabad, with 1,462 people.

Sarbaz Rural District was transferred to the Central District in 2018.
