= Sarkur Rural District =

Rural district in Sistan and Baluchestan province, Iran

Sarkur Rural District Persian: دهستان سرکور
- Rural District
- Location within Iran
- Coordinates: 26°47′51″N 61°05′31″E
- Country: Iran
- Province: Sistan and Baluchestan
- County: Sarbaz
- District: Central
- Capital: Machkur

Population (2016)
  - Total: 17,056
- Time zone: UTC+3:30 (IRST)

Sarkur Rural District (Persian: دهستان سرکور) is in the Central District of Sarbaz County, Sistan and Baluchestan province, Iran. Its capital is the village of Machkur.

== Demographics ==
=== Population ===
At the time of the 2006 National Census, the rural district's population (as a part of the former Sarbaz District) was 12,741 in 2,534 households. There were 13,862 inhabitants in 3,268 households at the following census of 2011. The 2016 census measured the population of the rural district as 17,056 in 4,145 households. The most populous of its 166 villages was Padik, with 796 people.

Sarkur Rural District was transferred to the Central District in 2018.
