= Rask and Firuzabad Rural District =

Rural district in Sistan and Baluchestan province, Iran

Rask and Firuzabad Rural District Persian: دهستان راسک و فیروزآباد
- Rural District
- Location within Iran
- Coordinates: 26°15′09″N 61°20′20″E
- Country: Iran
- Province: Sistan and Baluchestan
- County: Rask
- District: Central
- Capital: Rask

Population (2016)
  - Total: 7,391
- Time zone: UTC+3:30 (IRST)

Rask and Firuzabad Rural District (Persian: دهستان راسک و فیروزآباد) is in the Central District of Rask County, (Note: Formerly Sarbaz County) Sistan and Baluchestan province, Iran. It is administered from the city of Rask.

== Demographics ==
=== Population ===
At the time of the 2006 National Census, the rural district's population (as a part of the Central District of Sarbaz County) was 6,308 in 1,225 households. There were 6,310 inhabitants in 1,360 households at the following census of 2011. The 2016 census measured the population of the rural district as 7,391 in 1,802 households. The most populous of its 19 villages was Firuzabad, with 2,323 people.

After the census, the rural district was separated from the county in the establishment of Rask County and transferred to the new Central District.
