= Central District (Rask County) =

District in Sistan and Baluchestan province, Iran

Central District (Rask County) Persian: بخش مرکزی شهرستان راسک
- District
- Location within Iran
- Coordinates: 26°06′30″N 61°24′44″E
- Country: Iran
- Province: Sistan and Baluchestan
- County: Rask
- Capital: Rask
- Time zone: UTC+3:30 (IRST)

The Central District of Rask County (Note: Formerly Sarbaz County) (Persian: بخش مرکزی شهرستان راسک) is in Sistan and Baluchestan province, Iran. Its capital is the city of Rask, whose population at the time of the 2016 National Census was 10,115 people in 2,411 households.

== History ==
After the 2016 census, Parud District, Pishin District, Jakigur Rural District, Rask and Firuzabad Rural District, and the city of Rask were separated from Sarbaz County in the establishment of Rask County, which was divided into three districts of two rural districts each, with Rask as its capital.

== Demographics ==
=== Administrative divisions ===
Central District (Rask County)
Administrative Divisions
Jakigur RD
Rask and Firuzabad RD
Rask (city)
RD = Rural District
