= Jakigur Rural District =

Rural district in Sistan and Baluchestan province, Iran

Jakigur Rural District Persian: دهستان جکیگور
- Rural District
- Location within Iran
- Coordinates: 26°05′59″N 61°24′56″E
- Country: Iran
- Province: Sistan and Baluchestan
- County: Rask
- District: Central
- Capital: Jakigur

Population (2016)
  - Total: 12,419
- Time zone: UTC+3:30 (IRST)

Jakigur Rural District (Persian: دهستان جکیگور) is in the Central District of Rask County, (Note: Formerly Sarbaz County) Sistan and Baluchestan province, Iran. Its capital is the village of Jakigur.

== Demographics ==
=== Population ===
At the time of the 2006 National Census, the rural district's population (as a part of Pishin District of Sarbaz County) was 10,059 in 2,057 households. There were 11,566 inhabitants in 2,506 households at the following census of 2011, by which time it had been transferred to the Central District. The 2016 census measured the population of the rural district as 12,419 in 3,155 households. The most populous of its 32 villages was Jakigur, with 4,611 people.

After the census, the rural district was separated from the county in the establishment of Rask County and transferred to the new Central District.
