= Parud Rural District =

Rural district in Sistan and Baluchestan province, Iran

Parud Rural District Persian: دهستان پارود
- Rural District
- Location within Iran
- Coordinates: 26°25′04″N 61°22′02″E
- Country: Iran
- Province: Sistan and Baluchestan
- County: Rask
- District: Parud
- Capital: Parud

Population (2016)
  - Total: 25,214
- Time zone: UTC+3:30 (IRST)

Parud Rural District (Persian: دهستان پارود) is in Parud District of Rask County, (Note: Formerly Sarbaz County) Sistan and Baluchestan province, Iran. It is administered from the city of Parud.

== Demographics ==
=== Population ===
At the time of the 2006 National Census, the rural district's population (as a part of the Central District of Sarbaz County) was 20,462 in 3,948 households. There were 31,837 inhabitants in 7,280 households at the following census of 2011, by which time the rural district had been separated from the district in the formation of Parud District. The 2016 census measured the population of the rural district as 25,214 in 6,151 households. The most populous of its 54 villages was Jangal, with 3,071 people.

After the census, the district was separated from the county in the establishment of Rask County.
