= Zardban Rural District =

Rural district in Sistan and Baluchestan province, Iran

Zardban Rural District Persian: دهستان زردبن
- Rural District
- Location within Iran
- Coordinates: 25°55′12″N 61°45′11″E
- Country: Iran
- Province: Sistan and Baluchestan
- County: Rask
- District: Pishin
- Capital: Zardban

Population (2016)
  - Total: 4,119
- Time zone: UTC+3:30 (IRST)

Zardban Rural District (Persian: دهستان زردبن) is in Pishin District of Rask County, (Note: Formerly Sarbaz County) Sistan and Baluchestan province, Iran. Its capital is the village of Zardban.

== History ==
Zardban Rural District was created in Pishin District of Sarbaz County after the 2006 National Census.

== Demographics ==
=== Population ===
At the time of the 2011 census, the rural district's population (as a part of Saravan County) was 3,970 inhabitants in 875 households. The 2016 census measured the population of the rural district as 4,119 in 1,059 households. The most populous of its 15 villages was Zardban, with 1,311 people.

After the census, the district was separated from the county in the establishment of Rask County.
