= Pishin, Iran =

City in Sistan and Baluchestan province, Iran

Pishin پيشين
- City
- Location within Iran
- Coordinates: 26°04′45″N 61°44′57″E
- Country: Iran
- Province: Sistan and Baluchestan
- County: Rask
- District: Pishin
- Elevation: 219 m (719 ft)

Population (2016)
  - Total: 16,011
- Time zone: UTC+3:30 (IRST)

Pishin (Persian: پيشين,) (Note: Also romanized as Pīshīn) is a city in, and the capital of Pishin District of Rask County, (Note: Formerly Sarbaz County) Sistan and Baluchestan province, Iran. It also serves as the administrative center for Pishin Rural District.

== Demographics ==
=== Language and ethnicity ===
The overwhelming majority of the city's inhabitants are ethnic Baloch who speak the Balochi language.

=== Population ===
At the time of the 2006 National Census, the city's population was 10,477 in 1,832 households, when it was in Sarbaz County. The following census in 2011 counted 13,690 people in 2,816 households. The 2016 census measured the population of the city as 16,011 people in 3,426 households.

After the census, the district was separated from the county in the establishment of Rask County.

== Overview ==
Pishin has an altitude of 219 metres (721 feet). It is near the Pakistani border, across which is the town of Mand to the east. The Iranian government has set up a customs post to develop border trade between Iran and Pakistan.

It was the site of the 2009 Pishin bombing.

== Dam ==
The largest dam in Sistan and Baluchistan province has been built south of Pishin to provide water for agriculture and human consumption in Pishin and Bahu districts.
