= Naskand Rural District =

Rural district in Sistan and Baluchestan province, Iran

Naskand Rural District Persian: دهستان نسکند
- Rural District
- Location within Iran
- Coordinates: 26°46′40″N 61°26′20″E
- Country: Iran
- Province: Sistan and Baluchestan
- County: Sarbaz
- District: Naskand
- Capital: Naskand

Population (2016)
  - Total: 13,883
- Time zone: UTC+3:30 (IRST)

Naskand Rural District (Persian: دهستان نسکند) is in Naskand District of Sarbaz County, Sistan and Baluchestan province, Iran. Its capital is the village of Naskand.

== Demographics ==
=== Population ===
At the time of the 2006 National Census, the rural district's population (as a part of the former Sarbaz District) was 13,986 in 2,821 households. There were 10,845 inhabitants in 2,302 households at the following census of 2011. The 2016 census measured the population of the rural district as 13,883 in 3,337 households. The most populous of its 59 villages was Kafeh-ye Balochi, with 1,975 people.

The rural district was separated from the district in the formation of Naskand District in 2018.
