= Mattie Bogenrief =

American politician

Member of the Iowa House of Representatives from the 37th district
- In office January 11, 1965 – January 8, 1967
- Preceded by: William Denman; Howard Reppert
- Succeeded by: Multi-member district

Personal details
- Born: October 12, 1912 Duluth, Minnesota
- Died: June 14, 1971 (aged 58)
- Party: Democratic

Mattie Bogenrief (October 12, 1912 – June 14, 1971) was an American politician who served in the Iowa House of Representatives from the 37th district from 1965 to 1967.
