= Bogen Glacier =

Glacier in South Georgia

- Location within South Georgia Island
- Location: South Georgia
- Coordinates: 54°48′S 35°56′W
- Thickness: unknown
- Status: retreat

Bogen Glacier (54°48′S 35°56′W) is a small glacier on the north side of Drygalski Fjord between Trendall Crag and Hamilton Bay, at the southeast end of South Georgia. It was named by the UK Antarctic Place-Names Committee in 1979 after Arne Bogen, Norwegian sealer working in South Georgia after 1950; Master of the sealing vessel Albatross and Station Foreman, Grytviken.

== See also ==
- List of glaciers in the Antarctic
- Glaciology
- Retreat of glaciers since 1850
- Glacier mass balance
