= Bogan (disambiguation) =

Bogan is a pejorative term used in Australia and New Zealand.

Bogan may also refer to:

- Bogano, a grass planet was located in the Outer Rim system in the 2019 video game Star Wars Jedi: Fallen Order
- Bogan (surname)
- Bauchan, a being in Scottish folklore
- Boggart, a being in English folklore
- Bogan Pride, an Australian comedy television series
- Things Bogans Like, an Australian website and bestselling book
- Upper Middle Bogan, an Australian comedy television series
- Bogan (film), a 2017 Indian film
- A name for the dark side of the Force in the Star Wars universe

== Places ==
- Bogan, Iran, a village in Khuzestan Province, Iran
- Bogan-e Bala, Iran
- Bogan NSW 2825, a bounded rural locality in New South Wales
- Bogan Gate, a town in New South Wales
- Bogan Shire, a local government area in New South Wales
- Bogan River in New South Wales
- Bogandé Department, Burkina Faso
- Bogan High School (Chicago)
