= Pishin Rural District =

Rural district in Sistan and Baluchestan province, Iran

Pishin Rural District Persian: دهستان پیشین
- Rural District
- Location within Iran
- Coordinates: 26°08′36″N 61°43′22″E
- Country: Iran
- Province: Sistan and Baluchestan
- County: Rask
- District: Pishin
- Capital: Pishin

Population (2016)
  - Total: 10,102
- Time zone: UTC+3:30 (IRST)

Pishin Rural District (Persian: دهستان پیشین) is in Pishin District of Rask County, (Note: Formerly Sarbaz County) Sistan and Baluchestan province, Iran. It is administered from the city of Pishin.

== Demographics ==
=== Population ===
At the time of the 2006 National Census, the rural district's population (as a part of Sarbaz County) was 9,044 in 1,673 households. There were 7,371 inhabitants in 1,452 households at the following census of 2011. The 2016 census measured the population of the rural district as 10,102 in 2,456 households. The most populous of its 161 villages was Suldan, with 723 people.

After the census, the district was separated from the county in the establishment of Rask County.
