= Bogen Dam =

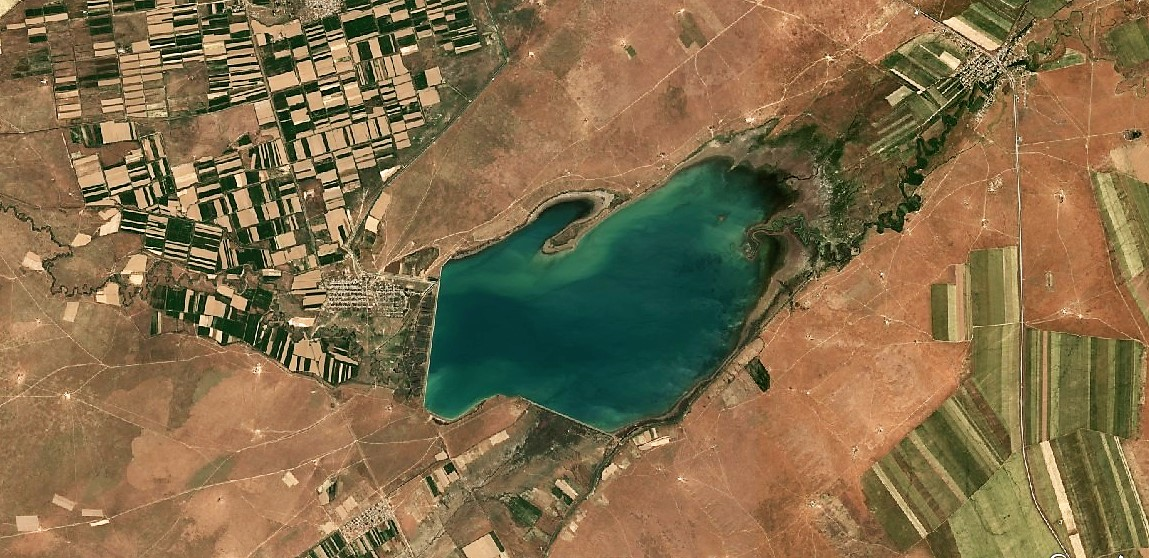
- Bogen Reservoir Sentinel-2 image.

- Location within Kazakhstan
- Official name: Бөген бөгені
- Country: Kazakhstan
- Location: Ordabasy District, Turkistan Region
- Coordinates: 42°43′16″N 69°01′04″E
- Purpose: Water supply
- Opening date: 1967; 59 years ago

Dam and spillways
- Type of dam: Earth, concrete
- Impounds: Bogen River

Reservoir
- Creates: Bogen Reservoir
- Total capacity: 377,000,000 m^{3} (306,000 acre⋅ft)
- Surface area: 65 km^{2} (25 mi^{2})
- Maximum length: 13 km (8.1 mi)
- Maximum width: 6 km (3.7 mi)

Bogen Dam (Kazakh: Бөген бөгені; Russian: Бугуньское водохранилище) is a dam in Ordabasy District, Turkistan Region, Kazakhstan.

The dam is located in the lower course of the Bogen River, in the central part of Ordabasy District.

== History ==
The Bogen Dam was commissioned in 1967 at the time of the Kazakh SSR. It is used for the irrigation of nearby agricultural fields.

== Reservoir ==
The reservoir of the dam has a maximum storage capacity of 377,000,000 m^{3} (306,000 acre⋅ft) and a surface area of 65 km^{2} (25 mi^{2}). The average depth is 6 m (20 ft), with a maximum depth of 15 m (49 ft). The water of the reservoir is fresh. The main fish species living in it are snowtrout, Aral barbel, common roach, common bream, Eurasian carp, wels catfish, zander, donmanday and grass carp. Bogen Dam fisheries have local importance, with an average of 300 T (3,000,000 G) of fish caught in the reservoir yearly.

== See also ==
- List of dams and reservoirs
