= Murtan, Iranshahr =

Murtan مورتان
- Village
- Location within Iran
- Coordinates: 27°20′06″N 60°46′34″E
- Country: Iran
- Province: Sistan and Baluchestan
- County: Iranshahr
- Bakhsh: Central
- Rural District: Damen

Population (2006)
  - Total: 220
- Time zone: UTC+3:30 (IRST)
  - Summer (DST): UTC+4:30 (IRDT)

Murtan (Persian: مورتان, also Romanized as Mūrtān) is a village in Damen Rural District, in the Central District of Iranshahr County, Sistan and Baluchestan Province, Iran. At the 2006 census, its population was 220, in 49 families.
