= Murtan Rural District =

Rural district in Sistan and Baluchestan province, Iran

Murtan Rural District Persian: دهستان مورتان
- Rural District
- Location within Iran
- Coordinates: 26°23′02″N 61°53′38″E
- Country: Iran
- Province: Sistan and Baluchestan
- County: Rask
- District: Parud
- Capital: Murtan

Population (2016)
  - Total: 9,516
- Time zone: UTC+3:30 (IRST)

Murtan Rural District (Persian: دهستان مورتان) is in Parud District of Rask County, (Note: Formerly Sarbaz County) Sistan and Baluchestan province, Iran. Its capital is the village of Murtan.

== Demographics ==
=== Population ===
At the time of the 2006 National Census, the rural district's population (as a part of the Central District of Sarbaz County) was 8,039 in 1,465 households. There were 8,340 inhabitants in 1,744 households at the following census of 2011, by which time the rural district had been separated from the district in the establishment of Parud District. The 2016 census measured the population of the rural district as 9,516 in 2,812 households. The most populous of its 102 villages was Murtan, with 1,348 people.

After the census, the district was separated from the county in the establishment of Rask County.
