= Øystein Bogen =

Norwegian journalist and documentary film maker

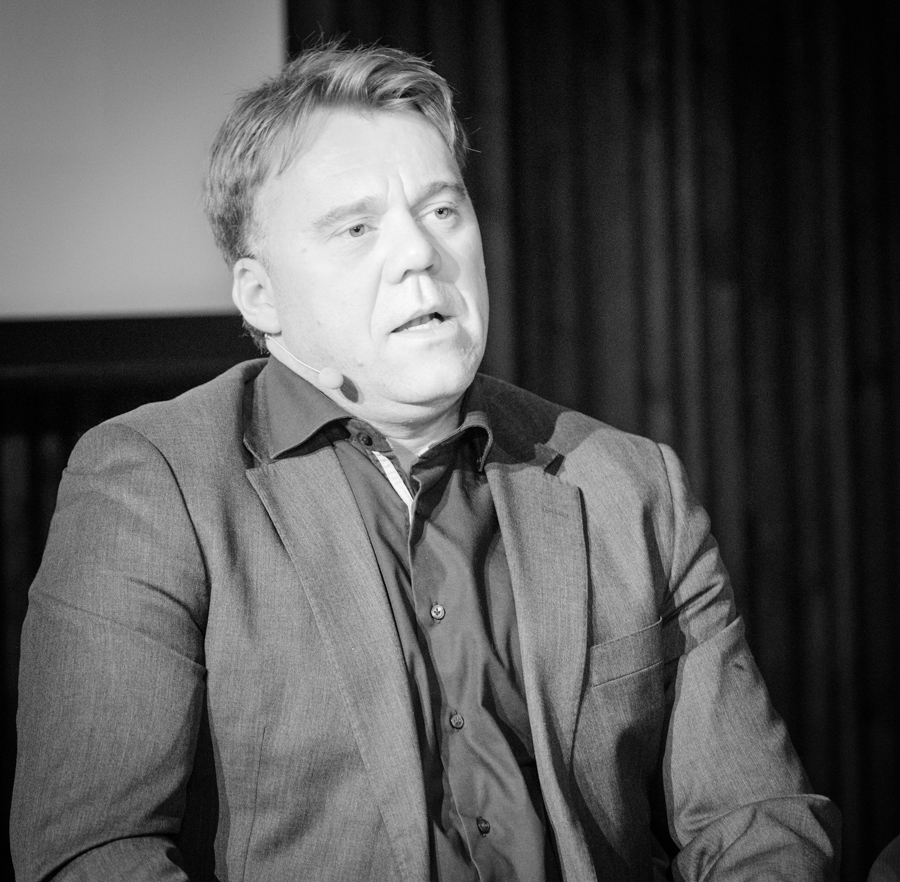
Øystein Bogen in 2018

Øystein Bogen (born 20 December 1969) is a Norwegian journalist and documentary film maker. Bogen has been working for TV 2 Norway as a foreign correspondent and editor since 1995.

He has mainly been covering Russia and the former Soviet Union, but also a range of international wars and conflicts, including the Kosovo War, the Russo-Georgian War and the War in Donbass.

Øystein Bogen gained a lot of international attention ahead of the 2014 Winter Olympics in Sotchi when he and TV 2 cameraman Aage Aune were arrested and questioned for several days by Russian police while working on critical reports of the organisation of the event.

The episode led to an unusual public apology from the Russian Foreign Ministry.

== Filmography ==
Bogen has directed 16 documentaries which have been broadcast by TV 2 and other international broadcasters, including:

- Kursk (2000) together with Odd Isungset and Per-Christian Magnus. The documentary was awarded the 2000 Golden Nymph Award at the Monte-Carlo International Television Festival and was nominated for the Norwegian Amanda Award in 2001
- A Letter from the Deep (2001)
- A Prayer for Beslan (2005), which won the 2006 Columbine Award at the Moondance International Film Festival in the US, and the 2005 Golden Word Award from the Russian Media Union
- Pirate Hunting (2009)
- The Battle for Attica Square (2010). Awarded the Norwegian Silver Umbrella in 2011 and Honorable Mention from Norwegian International Reporter in 2011
- The Price of War (2011)

Øystein Bogen studied journalism at the University of Georgia, USA and has a master's degree in democracy building from the University of Bergen.

== Books ==
Bogen has published the following books, all with the Kagge publishing house:

- Putin og jeg. Russlands vei fra håp til håpløshet" (Putin and I: Russia's Path from Hope to Hopelessness) in 2016
- Russlands hemmelige krig mot Vesten (Russia's Secret War against the West) in 2018
- En uvanlig spion. Frode Berg, norsk etterretning og spøkelsene fra den kalde krigen (An improbable spy. Frode Berg, Norwegian spy and ghost from the Cold War) in 2019

== Other references ==
- IMDb
- Vimeo
