= Dan Bogan =

American gunfighter and outlaw of the Old West (born 1860)

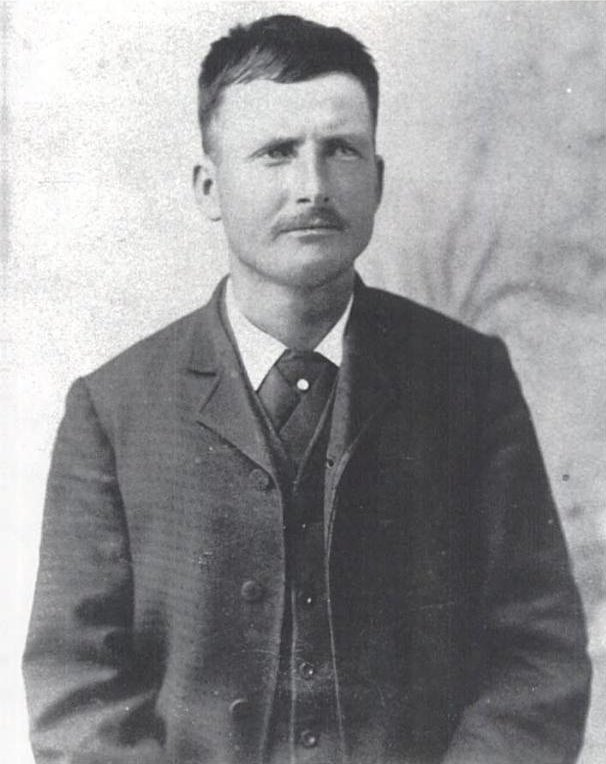
- Bogan c.1880
- Born: 1860; Alabama
- Died: after 1889
- Other names: Bill Gatlin, Bill McCoy
- Occupations: Cowboy, drover
- Status: Escaped
- Conviction: Murder
- Penalty: Death

Dan Bogan (1860 – unknown) was an American gunfighter and outlaw of the American Old West, is described as one of the most underrated gunmen of the 19th century west in the book "Deadly Dozen", by author Robert K. DeArment.

== Early life ==
Bogan was born in Alabama in 1860. His family moved to Hamilton County, Texas while Bogan was still only a boy, and Bogan began working as a cowboy as soon as his age would allow. After moving to Texas, his father died, and his mother would remarry and divorce twice, by the time Bogan was in his late teens. His two older brothers became involved in activities involving horse theft, resulting in one being shot and killed by the Hamilton County Sheriff, and the other receiving a prison term.

Bogan, thus far, had avoided criminal acts, but at the same time he was prone to fight, and often it seemed to many that he wished to do so. On May 2, 1881, while he and friend Dave Kemp were making their way around Hamilton's saloons drinking heavily, an intoxicated Bogan began taunting the patrons of the saloons, daring any who desired to take him on in a fight. Kemp began urging his friend to leave, and led him to where their horses were tied behind the W. T. Cropper General Store.

Before they reached their horses, Bogan came across local farmer F. A. "Doll" Smith, who was in town to buy supplies, seated on his wagon. Bogan began to verbally taunt Smith, calling him names and daring him to step down and stop him. Smith, who did not know Kemp or Bogan, at first ignored him. However, when Bogan dragged a chair out of Smith's wagon and began beating it on the ground, Smith became agitated. Bogan then replaced the chair, and again turned his taunts toward Smith. Smith had already made the statement that "I do not whip dogs, otherwise I'd step down and whip you".

By all accounts, Smith was a well-respected and even-tempered man. However Bogan's taunts began to wear on Smith, who eventually climbed down from his wagon and headed toward Bogan. As Smith walked toward Bogan, the latter stuck his hand into his coat. Smith told him that if he pulled his gun, he'd knock him to the ground. Bogan did pull his pistol, at which point Smith did knock him down with one punch. The two then wrestled briefly before Smith was able to take the young man's gun from him. As he did this, Kemp ran over producing his own handgun, and hit Smith in the back of the head. Smith then turned and pointed his pistol at Kemp, and pulled the trigger. However, the pistol misfired, according to witnesses, and Kemp fled at top speed. Smith turned Bogan's pistol over to the town marshal.

== Outlaw life ==
Bogan left Hamilton not long afterward, settling into working on ranches in and around the Texas Panhandle. In 1884, Bogan was a ring leader in a cowboy's strike for better wages, which ended in all who took part being blacklisted, finding themselves unable to work in the Panhandle. Bogan rode to Wilbarger County, Texas, and joined up for a cattle drive as a drover, working for the Worsham R-2 Ranch. Cowboy T. J Burkett, also working on that drive, would years later comment that Bogan was a valuable hand to have, and that one night during a fierce thunderstorm, Bogan alone was able to hold 600 head of cattle from breaking into stampede. When the drive reached Dodge City, Kansas, and the cowboys were paid, they commenced to drink and party. Believing they were getting out of hand, Town Marshal Jack Bridges and his deputies confronted them and ran them out of town. This resulted in a brief gunfight between the lawmen and the cowboys, during which cowboy John Briley was shot and killed. Bogan and Burkett were both involved in that escapade, and the cowboys took no action in retaliation.

After returning to the Panhandle, Bogan learned that things had gotten worse for the blacklisted cowboys. He joined up with cowboy Tom Harris, who had organised what was called the "Get Even Cattle Company", which was taking to the practice of placing their own brand on already branded calves owned by the ranchers. Bogan was by this time going by the name Bill Gatlin, and he registered two brands in his own name. The ranchers and county officials commissioned former Lincoln County, New Mexico sheriff Pat Garrett to stop the cowboys, and in doing so it was insinuated he either "should" or "could" kill the main ring leaders, which included Bogan.

At one point, Garrett and his followers rounded up 30 head of cattle bearing Bogan's brand, stating they were stolen, whereas Bogan claimed they were mavericks. Bogan approached lawyer H. H. Wallace, who demanded that Oldham County, Texas officials pay $25,000 in damages, and fearing Bogan might have a case, the county settled for $800. By the fall of that year, indictments had been handed down against 159 cowboys, Bogan being one, and Garrett and his men set out to round them up. Garrett, however, did not disguise his movements, as he did want to avoid trouble if possible and would be satisfied if the cowboys merely left.

In February 1885, Garrett and Oldham County Sheriff Jim East learned that three of the holdouts, those who refused to leave the Panhandle, were hiding out at the Howry Cattle Company headquarters. Riding all night through a snowstorm, they reached the house in which the cowboys were believed to be located. Cowboy Bob Bassett was outside the house gathering firewood, and spotted the posse, alerting the others. Tom Harris then yelled out to Garrett as to what his business was, to which Garrett announced he had warrants for Woods, Bogan and Thompson, but had no issues with anyone else. Nine cowboys then filed from the house, leaving only Thompson and Bogan inside. Woods was not present. Bogan and Woods, however, refused to surrender, and a shootout erupted, during which Bogan was able to make his escape, while Woods was killed. Three posse members were wounded during the exchange.

By 1886, Bogan was in Wyoming working for the Vorhees Ranch, near Lusk, Wyoming. He is known to have killed three men by this time, one was the alleged murder of a dance hall proprietor who prohibited Bogan and his men from ever entering his saloon. Bogan, who had taken the alias of Bill Gatlin at that time, still forced his way into the establishment, and when he met the proprietor with a rifle in his hands, Bogan drew his revolver and shot him in cold blood. Bill Calkin, the editor of the local newspaper, wrote that Bogan was possibly a cowboy wanted in Texas, and who had gone by at least two other names in the past. Bogan was infuriated, and Bogan set out looking for him, accompanied by cowboy Sterling Balou. The two entered the Cleveland Brothers Saloon, at which point Bogan drew his pistol calling for Calkin, and daring any of his friends to challenge him. One of the Cleveland brothers was able to bring a sawed off shotgun to bear on the two cowboys, and seconds later Charles S. Gunn entered with his own pistol drawn, backing Cleveland. Bogan and Balou retreated and fled.

A few days later, while Gunn was out of town, Bogan again went on a rampage. When Gunn returned, and learned of this, he went looking for Bogan, and warned him that if this happened again, he would arrest Bogan. To this, Bogan replied that he would do as he pleased. Gunn had a reputation, which he had shown on several occasions, as a man who would not back down nor be intimidated, and was known to have killed two men while holding that office. Gunn was a former Texas Ranger, who'd made his way up to Wyoming from Texas. Bogan hated Gunn, who had reprimanded him on several occasions by this point. However, by later witness accounts, Bogan feared Gunn, which probably led to what happened next.

== Murder of Gunn, jail escape ==
On January 14, 1887, Bogan again was causing a disturbance, this time in a dance hall. Gunn entered, yet again to stop him. Bogan, as he had on many occasions prior, backed down when confronted by Gunn. However, evidently Bogan was beginning to tire of the embarrassment of having been slighted so many times by Gunn. The following morning, January 15, 1887, Bogan was waiting inside the Jim Waters Saloon for Gunn to make his usual rounds. When Gunn entered, Bogan stated to him, "Charlie, are you heeled?", meaning was he armed. Gunn replied that he was always armed.

Accounts differ if Bogan drew his revolver or that he already had an unholstered revolver behind his back. Nonetheless, after learning that Gunn was armed, Bogan yelled "then turn her loose" before quickly whipping his gun and shooting Gunn in the stomach. As Gunn fell face down to the floor, Gunn pulled his own pistol, but before he could bring it up Bogan ran over and shot him point blank in the head, killing him. Bogan was so close when he fired this second shot, that the muzzle flash caught Gunn's hair on fire. Bogan brandished his pistol at the shocked patrons, and ran out, mounting a horse belonging to Jack Andrews. However, Deputy Marshal John Owens was quick to respond, and blocked Bogan's only exit from town. Owens fired one blast into the air as a warning, and when Bogan continued riding forward, Owens shot him in the shoulder, knocking Bogan from his saddle and into the street.

Bogan was placed in the back room of a local saloon, as there was no jail at the time, but before his shotgun wound had healed, the next day in fact, he took advantage of the poor security and made an escape during a roaring blizzard. Owens, knowing that Bogan was badly wounded, believed he could not go far. He was right, as two weeks later Bogan, burning up with fever and with his wound infected, sent word to Owens that he wished to surrender and receive medical attention. Bogan met with Owens sixteen miles outside of Lusk, and voiced to Owens that he feared a lynch mob would be waiting for him when they reached Lusk, as Gunn was extremely well liked and respected in the town. As they entered town, Owens backed down a mob that was intent on hanging Bogan, then Owens shackled Bogan in the back of the Sweeney Saloon. The next day, Owens left with Bogan en route to Cheyenne, Wyoming, and by February 4 he had him secured in the Laramie County jail.

On September 7, 1887, Bogan was convicted of murder, and sentenced to death. However, Bogan still had several friends in cowboy circles, namely Tom Hall, whom famed Old West detective Charlie Siringo would later identify as having actually been Tom Nicholls, a murderer from the Texas Panhandle. Hall paid professional safecracker James Jones to commit a minor crime in Cheyenne, and to allow himself to be captured, thus being placed in jail with Bogan. Concealed in his shoes Jones had saw blades, which he and Bogan used to saw through the bars and make an escape on October 4, 1887. Joined by fellow prisoners Charles H. LeRoy and Bill Steary, both horse thieves, they made their escape through a ventilator and onto the roof. Within hours a posse was organised in one of the largest manhunts in Wyoming history.

Laramie County Sheriff Seth Sharpless led the posses, which separated into groups of fifty men each. In addition to this, a $1,000 reward was placed on Bogan, dead or alive. When the manhunt did not produce Bogan, Siringo, acting on information he had received from sources, went undercover and was able to gain the confidence of Hall and his cohorts. Bogan, however, was no longer riding with them, and had made his way toward Utah. Siringo was able to produce evidence for indictments against Hall and several others for their having assisted Bogan, resulting in their arrests.

== Disappearance and rumors ==
Siringo continued to pursue Bogan, a trek which led him into Utah, then to New Mexico Territory, where he came into contact with Lem Woodruff, an old Panhandle friend to Bogan. According to Woodruff, Bogan was last known to be heading for New Orleans, Louisiana, intending on taking a ships passage to South America, stating he was tired of living on the run. The last he was heard of, Bogan sent a letter addressed to Tom Hall in Cheyenne, from New Orleans, indicating he was heading to Argentina.

Anything after that was mere hearsay. The Laramie Sentinel announced in 1889 that Bogan had been killed during a shootout in Mexico. In 1907 it was announced by yet another newspaper that he'd been killed when his horse bucked him, again in Mexico, suffering a broken neck. It was rumoured Bogan was killed while riding with bandits in Argentina, and also that he'd built a ranch there and prospered. In his book "A Lonestar Cowboy", published in 1919, Charlie Siringo revealed that he believed Bogan was still living, and that he had reason to believe Bogan had returned to the United States under yet another assumed name, married, settled in southwestern New Mexico, and raised a family on a small ranch. However, he never revealed the identity of who he believed Bogan to be, but suffice to say Siringo felt all but certain he knew these facts. In some support of Siringo's allegations, former Bogan friend A. C. Campbell stated in 1931 that the last he heard of Bogan, he was alive and well with a family, operating a small ranch under an assumed name in Texas.

== In media ==
Bogan is the gunfighter referenced as Candy Dan by Ames Jainchill in Death Wish (1974).

== See also ==
- List of fugitives from justice who disappeared
