= James Bogen =

American science philosopher

James Bogen is an American science philosopher currently at University of Pittsburgh and an Elected Fellow of the American Association for the Advancement of Science.
