= Minan District =

District in Sistan and Baluchestan province, Iran

Minan District Persian: بخش مینان
- District
- Location within Iran
- Coordinates: 26°33′32″N 61°32′01″E
- Country: Iran
- Province: Sistan and Baluchestan
- County: Sarbaz
- Capital: Batak
- Time zone: UTC+3:30 (IRST)

Minan District (Persian: بخش مینان) is in Sarbaz County, Sistan and Baluchestan province, Iran. Its capital is the village of Batak, whose population at the time of the 2016 National Census was 2,192 people in 533 households.

== History ==
In 2018, Minan Rural District was separated from Sarbaz District in the formation of Minan District.

== Demographics ==
=== Administrative divisions ===
Minan District
Administrative Divisions
Kazur RD
Minan RD
RD = Rural District
