= Naskand District =

District in Sistan and Baluchestan province, Iran

Naskand District Persian: بخش نسکند
- District
- Location within Iran
- Coordinates: 26°45′48″N 61°28′40″E
- Country: Iran
- Province: Sistan and Baluchestan
- County: Sarbaz
- Capital: Naskand
- Time zone: UTC+3:30 (IRST)

Naskand District (Persian: بخش نسکند) is in Sarbaz County, Sistan and Baluchestan province, Iran. Its capital is the village of Naskand, whose population at the time of the 2016 National Census was 802 people in 205 households.

== History ==
In September 2018, Naskand Rural District was separated from Sarbaz District in the formation of Naskand District.

== Demographics ==
=== Administrative divisions ===
Naskand District
Administrative Divisions
Balochi RD
Naskand RD
RD = Rural District
