= Toboggan (disambiguation) =

A toboggan is a type of sled.

Toboggan may also refer to:

- Knit cap, called a "toboggan" in some regional dialects of the United States
- Toboggan (BMX trick)
- Toboggan (Lakemont Park), a roller coaster
- Toboggan Handicap, a thoroughbred horse race
- Toboggan (horse), a thoroughbred race horse
- Water slide, called a "toboggan" in some languages

== See also ==
- Tabagan, a ski resort located in Almaty, Kazakhstan
