= Rask, Iran =

City in Sistan and Baluchestan province, Iran

Rask Persian: راسک
- City
- Location within Iran
- Coordinates: 26°14′08″N 61°24′05″E
- Country: Iran
- Province: Sistan and Baluchestan
- County: Rask
- District: Central

Population (2016)
  - Total: 10,115
- Time zone: UTC+3:30 (IRST)

Rask (Persian: راسک) (Note: Also romanized as Rāsak, Rāsk, and Rāzk) is a city in the Central District of Rask County, (Note: Formerly Sarbaz County) Sistan and Baluchestan province, Iran, serving as capital of both the county and the district. It is also the administrative center for Rask and Firuzabad Rural District. Rask is in the Sarbaz Mountains and beside the Sarbaz River. A road passing through the city links Chabahar Port to the national road network of Iran.

== Demographics ==
=== Population ===
At the time of the 2006 National Census, the city's population was 5,931 in 1,102 households, when it capital of the Central District of Sarbaz County. The following census in 2011 counted 8,472 people in 1,964 households. The 2016 census measured the population of the city as 10,115 people in 2,411 households.

After the census, the city and the rural district were separated from the county in the establishment of Rask County and were transferred to the new Central District, with Rask as the county's capital.
