= Pishin District (Iran) =

District in Sistan and Baluchestan province, Iran

Pishin District Persian: بخش پیشین
- District
- Location within Iran
- Coordinates: 26°02′17″N 61°43′22″E
- Country: Iran
- Province: Sistan and Baluchestan
- County: Rask
- Capital: Pishin

Population (2016)
  - Total: 30,232 (Note: As a part of Sarbaz County)
- Time zone: UTC+3:30 (IRST)

Pishin District (Persian: بخش پیشین) is in Rask County, (Note: Formerly Sarbaz County) Sistan and Baluchestan province, Iran. Its capital is the city of Pishin.

== History ==
After the 2006 National Census, Zardban Rural District was created in the district and Jakigur Rural District was separated from it to join the Central District of Sarbaz County.

After the 2016 census, Parud District was separated from the county in the establishment of Rask County, which was divided into three districts of two rural districts each, with the city of Rask as its capital.

== Demographics ==
=== Population ===
At the time of the 2006 census, the district's population (as a part of Sarbaz County) was 19,521 in 3,505 households. The following census in 2011 counted 25,031 people in 5,143 households. The 2016 census measured the population of the district as 30,232 inhabitants in 6,941 households.

=== Administrative divisions ===
Pishin District Population (Note: As a part of Sarbaz County at the 2006, 2011, and 2016 censuses)
Administrative Divisions	2006	2011	2016
Jakigur RD (Note: Transferred to the Central District of Sarbaz County)	10,059		
Pishin RD	9,044	7,371	10,102
Zardban RD		3,970	4,119
Pishin (city)	10,477	13,690	16,011
Total	29,580	25,031	30,232
RD = Rural District
