= Minan Rural District =

Rural district in Sistan and Baluchestan province, Iran

Minan Rural District Persian: دهستان مینان
- Rural District
- Location within Iran
- Coordinates: 26°36′58″N 61°23′26″E
- Country: Iran
- Province: Sistan and Baluchestan
- County: Sarbaz
- District: Minan
- Capital: Batak

Population (2016)
  - Total: 18,733
- Time zone: UTC+3:30 (IRST)

Minan Rural District (Persian: دهستان مینان) is in Minan District of Sarbaz County, Sistan and Baluchestan province, Iran. Its capital is the village of Batak.

== Demographics ==
=== Population ===
At the time of the 2006 National Census, the rural district's population (as a part of the former Sarbaz District) was 18,275 in 3,400 households. There were 19,268 inhabitants in 3,930 households at the following census of 2011. The 2016 census measured the population of the rural district as 18,733 in 4,544 households. The most populous of its 77 villages was Batak, with 2,192 people.

The rural district was separated from the district in the formation of Minan District in 2018.
