= Kishkur Rural District =

Rural district in Sistan and Baluchestan province, Iran

Kishkur Rural District Persian: دهستان کیشکور
- Rural District
- Location within Iran
- Coordinates: 26°24′28″N 61°05′30″E
- Country: Iran
- Province: Sistan and Baluchestan
- County: Sarbaz
- District: Kishkur
- Capital: Raisabad

Population (2016)
  - Total: 11,276
- Time zone: UTC+3:30 (IRST)

Kishkur Rural District (Persian: دهستان کیشکور) is in Kishkur District of Sarbaz County, Sistan and Baluchestan province, Iran. Its capital is the village of Raisabad.

== Demographics ==
=== Population ===
At the time of the 2006 National Census, the rural district's population (as a part of the former Sarbaz District) was 10,147 in 2,165 households. There were 10,513 inhabitants in 2,363 households at the following census of 2011. The 2016 census measured the population of the rural district as 11,276 in 2,984 households. The most populous of its 58 villages was Hajjiabad, with 1,792 people.

The rural district was separated from the district in the formation of Kishkur District in 2018.
