= Sarbaz =

City in Sistan and Baluchestan province, Iran

Sarbaz Persian: سرباز
- City
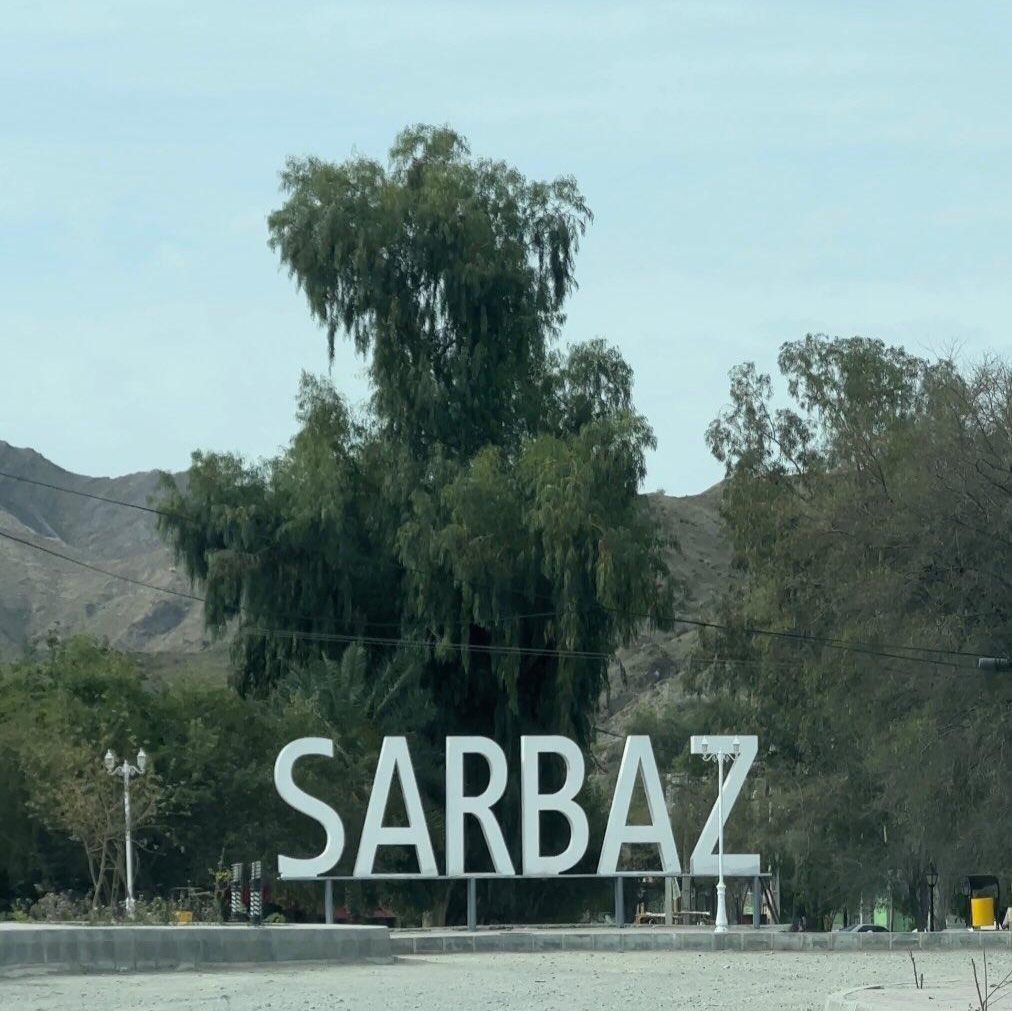

- Location within Iran
- Coordinates: 26°37′54″N 61°15′26″E
- Country: Iran
- Province: Sistan and Baluchestan
- County: Sarbaz
- District: Central

Population (2016)
  - Total: 2,020
- Time zone: UTC+3:30 (IRST)

Sarbaz (Persian: سرباز) (Note: Also romanized as Sarbāz; also known as Qal‘eh-ye Sarbāz (English: Fort Sarbaz)) is a city in the Central District of Sarbaz County, Sistan and Baluchestan province, Iran, serving as capital of both the county and the district.

== Demographics ==
=== Language and ethnicity ===
The overwhelming majority of the city's inhabitants are ethnic Baluch who speak the Baluchi language.

=== Population ===
At the time of the 2006 National Census, the city's population was 1,047 in 234 households, when it was capital of the former Sarbaz District. The following census in 2011 counted 1,230 people in 293 households. The 2016 census measured the population of the city as 2,020 people in 495 households.

Sarbaz was transferred to the Central District as the county's capital in 2018.
