= Bogen (river) =

Bogen Бөген
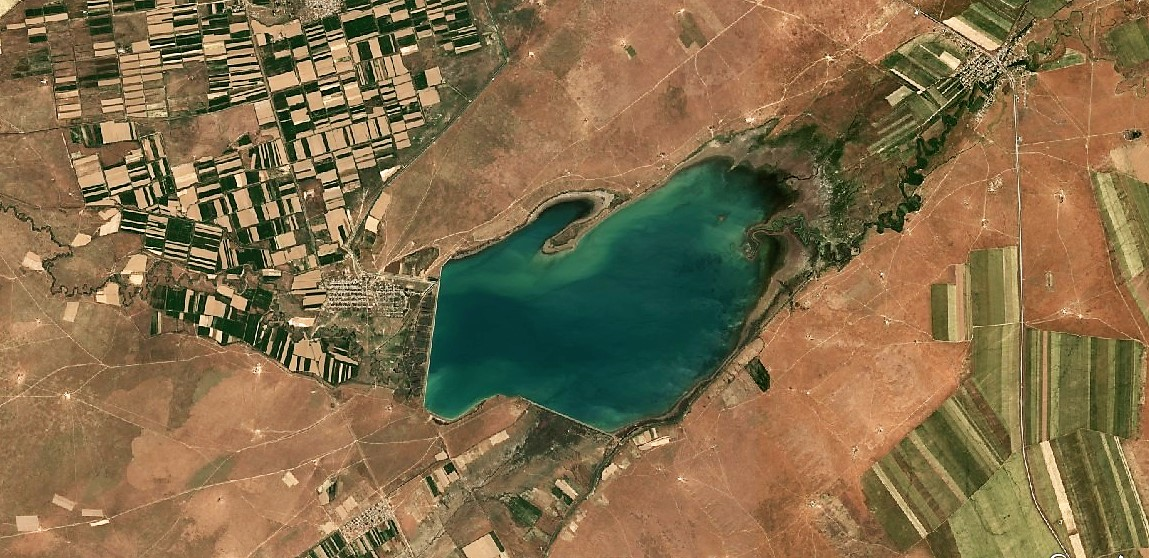
- Bogen Dam Sentinel-2 image

- Mouth location in Kazakhstan

Location
- Country: Kazakhstan

Physical characteristics
- Source: Karatau
- Mouth: Kum-Kol
  - coordinates: 42.9588°N 68.5791°E
- Length: 164 km (102 mi)
- Basin size: 4,680 km^{2} (1,810 sq mi)

The Bogen (Kazakh: Бөген Bögen, Russian: Бугунь Bugun) is a river in Baydibek and Otyrar districts, Turkistan Region, southern Kazakhstan. It has a length of 164 kilometres (102 mi) with a basin area of 4,680 square kilometres (1,810 mi^{2}).

In 1967 the Bogen Dam, with an area of 65 km^{2} (25 sq mi), was built on the river, connecting to the Syr Darya basin by means of the Arys-Turkestan Canal. The waters are used for irrigation.

== Course ==
The river begins at the confluence of the rivers Ulken Bogen and Bala Bogen, flowing from the southwestern slopes of the Karatau ridge. It flows roughly westwards through a floodplain that is between 300 m (980 ft) and 600 m (2,000 ft) wide. In its last stretch it bends northwards and discharges into lake Kum-Kol, not reaching the Syr Darya channel. The river is fed mainly by snow and groundwater. Its longest tributary is the 164 km (102 mi) long Shayan (Шаян), now flowing into the Arys-Turkestan Canal.
