= Kishkur District =

District in Sistan and Baluchestan province, Iran

Kishkur District Persian: بخش کیشکور
- District
- Location within Iran
- Coordinates: 26°28′37″N 60°58′16″E
- Country: Iran
- Province: Sistan and Baluchestan
- County: Sarbaz
- Capital: Raisabad
- Time zone: UTC+3:30 (IRST)

Kishkur District (Persian: بخش کیشکور) is in Sarbaz County, Sistan and Baluchestan province, Iran. Its capital is the village of Raisabad, whose population at the time of the 2016 National Census was 465 people in 127 households.

== History ==
In 2018, Kishkur Rural District was separated from Sarbaz District in the formation of Kishkur District.

== Demographics ==
=== Administrative divisions ===
Kishkur District
Administrative Divisions
Kishkur RD
Machan RD
RD = Rural District
