= Parud District =

District in Sistan and Baluchestan province, Iran

Parud District Persian: بخش پارود
- District
- Location within Iran
- Coordinates: 26°23′02″N 61°44′31″E
- Country: Iran
- Province: Sistan and Baluchestan
- County: Rask
- Capital: Parud

Population (2016)
  - Total: 34,730
- Time zone: UTC+3:30 (IRST)

Parud District (Persian: بخش پارود) is in Rask County, (Note: Formerly Sarbaz County) Sistan and Baluchestan province, Iran. Its capital is the city of Parud.

== History ==
After the 2006 National Census, Murtan and Parud Rural Districts were separated from the Central District of Sarbaz County in the formation of Parud District. After the 2016 census, the district was separated from the county in the establishment of Rask County, and the village of Parud was elevated to the status of a city.

== Demographics ==
=== Population ===
At the time of the 2011 census, the district's population was 40,177 people in 9,024 households. The 2016 census measured the population of the district as 34,730 inhabitants in 8,963 households.

=== Administrative divisions ===
Parud District Population (Note: As a part of Sarbaz County at the 2011 and 2016 censuses)
Administrative Divisions	2011	2016
Murtan RD	8,340	9,516
Parud RD	31,837	25,214
Parud (city) (Note: Became a city after the 2016 census)		
Total	40,177	34,730
RD = Rural District
