= Rask County =

County in Sistan and Baluchestan province, Iran

Rask County Persian: شهرستان راسک
- County
- Location of Rask County in Sistan and Baluchestan province (bottom right, yellow)

- Location of Sistan and Baluchestan province in Iran
- Coordinates: 26°09′57″N 61°44′43″E
- Country: Iran
- Province: Sistan and Baluchestan
- Capital: Rask
- Districts: Central, Parud, Pishin
- Time zone: UTC+3:30 (IRST)

Rask County (Persian: شهرستان راسک) (Note: Formerly Sarbaz County (شهرستان سرباز)) is in Sistan and Baluchestan province, Iran. Its capital is the city of Rask, whose population at the time of the 2016 National Census was 10,115 people in 2,411 households.

== History ==
After the 2016 census, Parud District, Pishin District, Jakigur Rural District, Rask and Firuzabad Rural District, and the city of Rask were separated from Sarbaz County in the establishment of Rask County, which was divided into three districts of two rural districts each, with Rask as its capital. The village of Parud was elevated to the status of a city.

== Demographics ==
=== Administrative divisions ===
Rask County's administrative structure is shown in the following table.

Rask County
Administrative Divisions
Central District
Jakigur RD
Rask and Firuzabad RD
Rask (city)
Parud District
Murtan RD
Parud RD
Parud (city) (Note: Became a city after the 2016 census)
Pishin District
Pishin RD
Zardban RD
Pishin (city)
RD = Rural District

== See also ==
Media related to Rask County at Wikimedia Commons
