= Central District (Sarbaz County) =

District in Sistan and Baluchestan province, Iran

Central District (Sarbaz County) Persian: بخش مرکزی شهرستان سرباز
- District
- Location within Iran
- Coordinates: 26°44′23″N 61°05′31″E
- Country: Iran
- Province: Sistan and Baluchestan
- County: Sarbaz
- Capital: Sarbaz

Population (2016)
  - Total: 29,925
- Time zone: UTC+3:30 (IRST)

The Central District of Sarbaz County (Persian: بخش مرکزی شهرستان سرباز) is in Sistan and Baluchestan province, Iran. Its capital is the city of Sarbaz. The previous capital of the district was the city of Rask.

== History ==
After the 2006 National Census, Murtan and Parud Rural Districts were separated from the district in the formation of Parud District, and Jakigur Rural District was transferred from Pishin District to the Central District.

In 2018, Rask and Firuzabad Rural District and the city of Rask were separated from the district in the establishment of Rask County. In September 2018, Sarbaz and Sarkur Rural Districts, and the city of Sarbaz, were transferred from Sarbaz District to the Central District.

== Demographics ==
=== Population ===
At the time of the 2006 census, the district's population was 40,740 in 7,740 households. The following census in 2011 counted 26,348 people in 5,830 households. The 2016 census measured the population of the district as 29,925 inhabitants in 7,368 households.

=== Administrative divisions ===
Central District (Sarbaz County) Population
Administrative Divisions	2006	2011	2016
Jakigur RD (Note: Transferred to Rask County after the 2016 census)		11,566	12,419
Murtan RD (Note: Transferred to Parud District)	8,039		
Parud RD	20,462		
Rask and Firuzabad RD	6,308	6,310	7,391
Sarbaz RD (Note: Transferred from Sarbaz District after the 2016 census)			
Sarkur RD			
Rask (city)	5,931	8,472	10,115
Sarbaz (city)			
Total	40,740	26,348	29,925
RD = Rural District
