= Sarbaz District =

Former district in Sistan and Baluchestan province, Iran

Sarbaz District Persian: بخش سرباز
- Former District
- Location within Iran
- Coordinates: 26°39′23″N 61°15′33″E
- Country: Iran
- Province: Sistan and Baluchestan
- County: Sarbaz
- Capital: Sarbaz

Population (2016)
  - Total: 91,274
- Time zone: UTC+3:30 (IRST)

Sarbaz District (Persian: بخش سرباز) is a former administrative division of Sarbaz County, Sistan and Baluchestan province, Iran. Its capital was the city of Sarbaz.

== History ==
In 2018, Kishkur, Minan, and Naskan Rural Districts were separated from the district in the formation of three districts of the same names. Additionally Sarbaz and Sarkur Rural Districts, and the city of Sarbaz, were transferred from Sarbaz District to the Central District.

== Demographics ==
=== Population ===
At the time of the 2006 National Census, the district's population was 80,570 in 15,792 households. The following census in 2011 counted 72,346 people in 15,695 households. The 2016 census measured the population of the district as 91,274 inhabitants in 22,634 households.

=== Administrative divisions ===
Sarbaz District Population
Administrative Divisions	2006	2011	2016
Kishkur RD (Note: Transferred to Kishkur District after the 2016 census)	10,147	10,513	11,276
Minan RD (Note: Transferred to Minan District after the 2016 census)	18,275	19,268	18,733
Naskand RD (Note: Transferred to Naskand District after the 2016 census)	13,986	10,845	13,883
Sarbaz RD (Note: Transferred to the Central District after the 2016 census)	24,374	16,628	28,306
Sarkur RD	12,741	13,862	17,056
Sarbaz (city)	1,047	1,230	2,020
Total	80,570	72,346	91,274
RD = Rural District
