= Sarbaz County =

County in Sistan and Baluchestan province, Iran

Sarbaz County Persian: شهرستان سرباز
- County
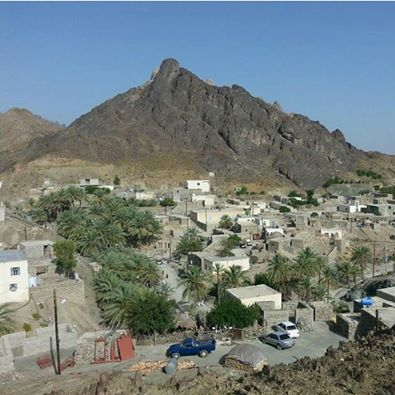
- The village of Padik

- Location of Sarbaz County in Sistan and Baluchestan province (center right, green)

- Location of Sistan and Baluchestan province in Iran
- Coordinates: 26°39′24″N 61°16′12″E
- Country: Iran
- Province: Sistan and Baluchestan
- Capital: Sarbaz
- Districts: Central

Population (2016)
  - Total: 186,165
- Time zone: UTC+3:30 (IRST)
  - Summer (DST): UTC+4:30 (IRDT)

Sarbaz County (Persian: شهرستان سرباز) is in Sistan and Baluchestan province, Iran. Its capital is the city of Sarbaz. The previous capital of the county was the city of Rask.

== History ==
After the 2006 National Census, Ashar District was separated from the county in the formation of Zaboli County; (Note: Renamed Mehrestan County) Murtan and Parud Rural Districts were separated from the Central District in the establishment of Parud District; Zardban Rural District was created in Pishin District, and Jakigur Rural District was separated from it to join the Central District.

After the 2016 census, Rask and Firuzabad Rural District, the city of Rask, Parud District, and Pishin District were separated from the county in the establishment of Rask County. In 2018, Kishkur, Minan, and Naskan Rural Districts were separated from Sarbaz District to create three districts of the same names, each with a new rural district: Machan, Kazur, and Balochi, respectively. Additionally, Sarbaz and Sarkur Rural Districts, and the city of Sarbaz, were transferred from Sarbaz District to the Central District.

== Demographics ==
=== Population ===
At the time of the 2006 census, the county's population was 162,960, in 31,449 households. The following census in 2011 counted 164,557 people in 35,820 households. The 2016 census measured the population of the county as 186,165 in 45,910 households. The vast majority are Sunni Muslims of Baloch ethnicity.

=== Administrative divisions ===
Sarbaz County's population history and administrative structure over three consecutive censuses are shown in the following table.

Sarbaz County Population
Administrative Divisions	2006	2011	2016
Central District	40,740	26,348	29,925
Jakigur RD (Note: Transferred to Rask County after the 2016 census)		11,566	12,419
Murtan RD	8,039		
Parud RD	20,462		
Rask and Firuzabad RD	6,308	6,310	7,391
Sarbaz RD			
Sarkur RD			
Rask (city)	5,931	8,472	10,115
Sarbaz (city)			
Ashar District (Note: Transferred to Zaboli County)	12,070		
Ashar RD	7,884		
Irafshan RD	4,186		
Kishkur District (Note: Established after the 2016 census)			
Kishkur RD			
Machan RD			
Minan District			
Kazur RD			
Minan RD			
Naskand District			
Balochi RD			
Naskand RD			
Parud District		40,177	34,730
Murtan RD		8,340	9,516
Parud RD		31,837	25,214
Pishin District	29,580	25,031	30,232
Jakigur RD	10,059		
Pishin RD	9,044	7,371	10,102
Zardban RD		3,970	4,119
Pishin (city)	10,477	13,690	16,011
Sarbaz District	80,570	72,346	91,274
Kishkur RD	10,147	10,513	11,276
Minan RD	18,275	19,268	18,733
Naskand RD	13,986	10,845	13,883
Sarbaz RD	24,374	16,628	28,306
Sarkur RD	12,741	13,862	17,056
Sarbaz (city)	1,047	1,230	2,020
Total	162,960	164,557	186,165
RD = Rural District

== See also ==
Media related to Sarbaz County at Wikimedia Commons
