= Smiling Fishergirl =

Painting by Frans Hals

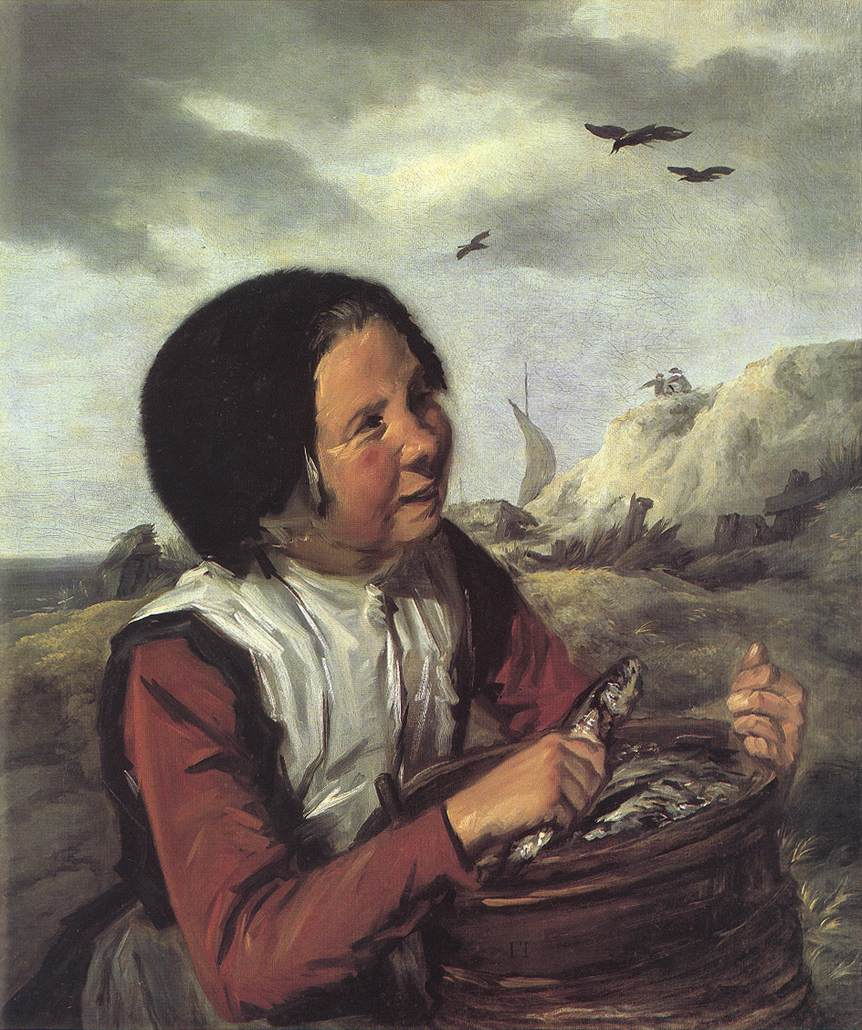
- Smiling Fishergirl, c.1630, oil on canvas, 80.6 cm x 66.7 cm
- Artist: Frans Hals
- Year: c. 1630
- Catalogue: Seymour Slive, Catalog 1974: #72
- Medium: Oil on canvas
- Dimensions: 80.6 cm × 66.7 cm (31.7 in × 26.3 in)
- Location: Private collection

Smiling Fishergirl is an oil-on-canvas painting by the Dutch Golden Age painter Frans Hals, painted in the early 1630s, now in a private collection.

== Painting ==
This painting was documented by Cornelis Hofstede de Groot in 1910, who wrote:

114. A WOMAN SELLING HERRINGS. B. 51.; In a dune landscape, a girl seen to the knees sits facing three-quarters right. She smiles and looks to the right. On her lap she holds with her left hand a wooden tub of herrings. She holds a fish in her right hand, which rests on the edge of the tub. She wears a red bodice, a white scarf, and a black cap. In the left distance is the sea. To the right are high dunes on which are two figures standing. To the left of them is the sail of a ship. The sky is covered with grey clouds. Three birds are flying. Signed on the tub with the monogram; canvas, 32 inches by 26 1/2 inches. An old copy was in the possession of a London dealer in 1908. Engraved by Gaujean. In the Oudry collection. Sale. Baron de Beurnonville, Paris, May 9, 1881, No. 302.

Hofstede de Groot noted several fisherboys by Hals along with this one (catalogue numbers 49 through to 58c). This painting was also documented by W.R. Valentiner in 1923.

Other fisher folk by Hals:

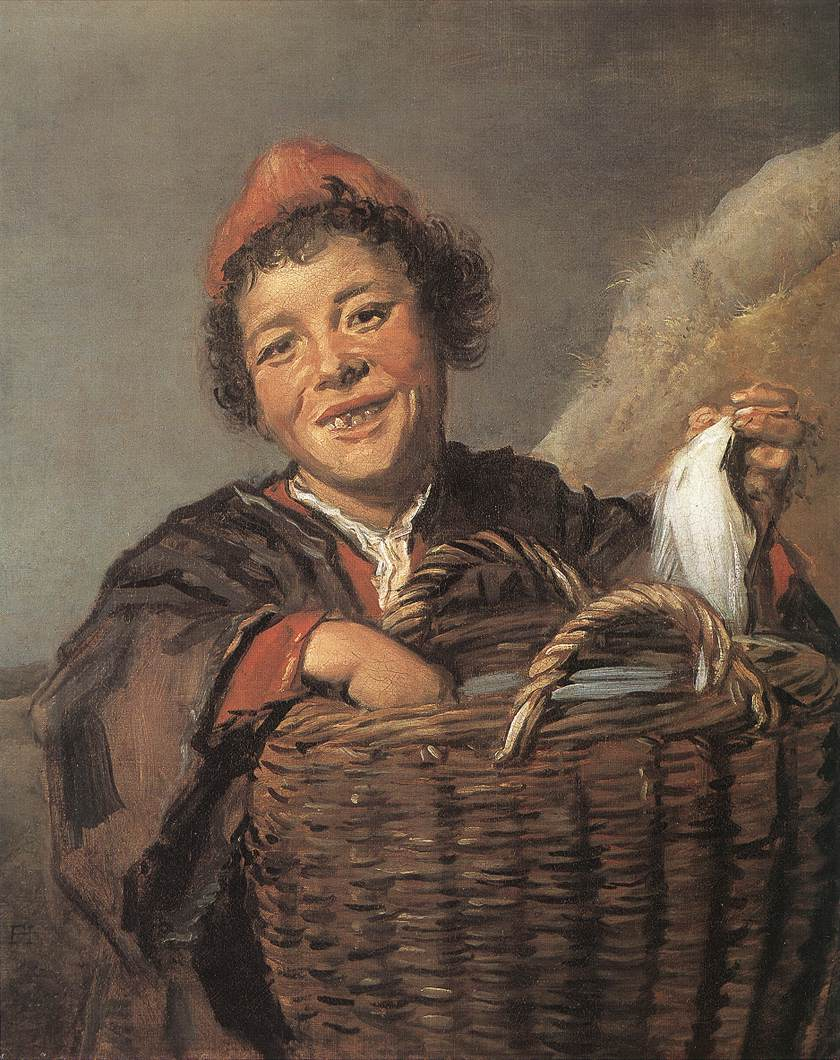
Fisher boy with basket

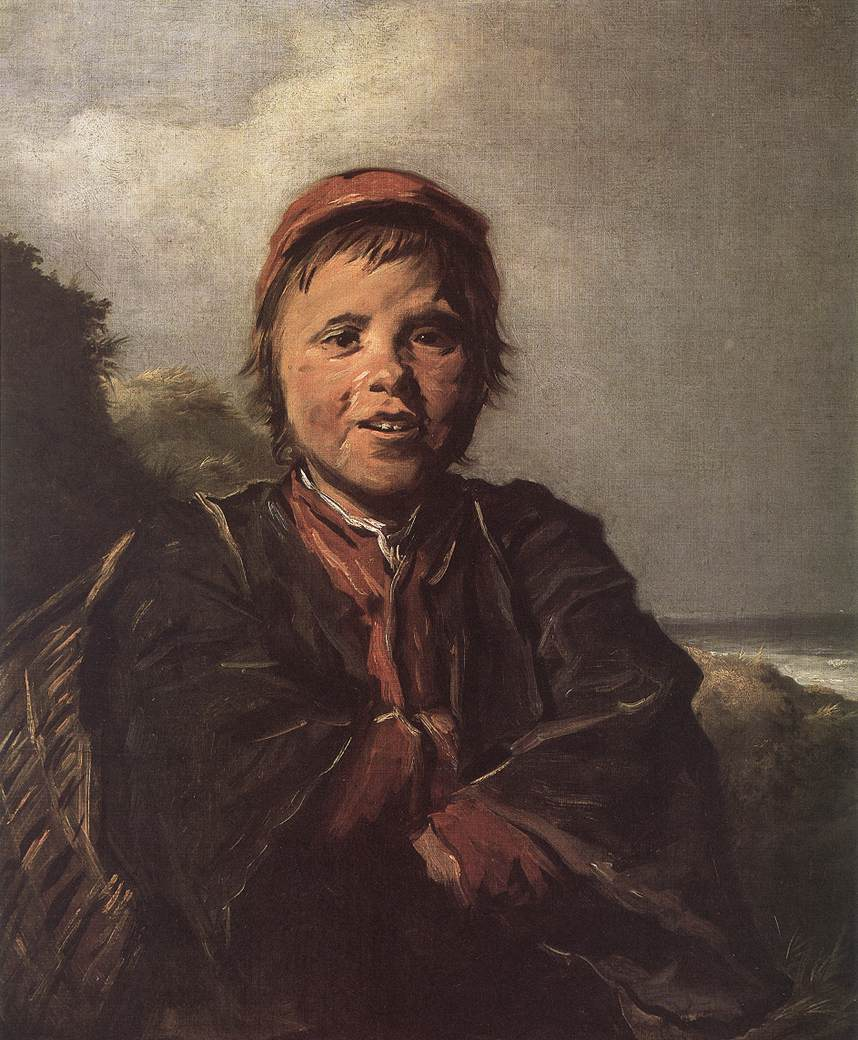
The Fisher Boy

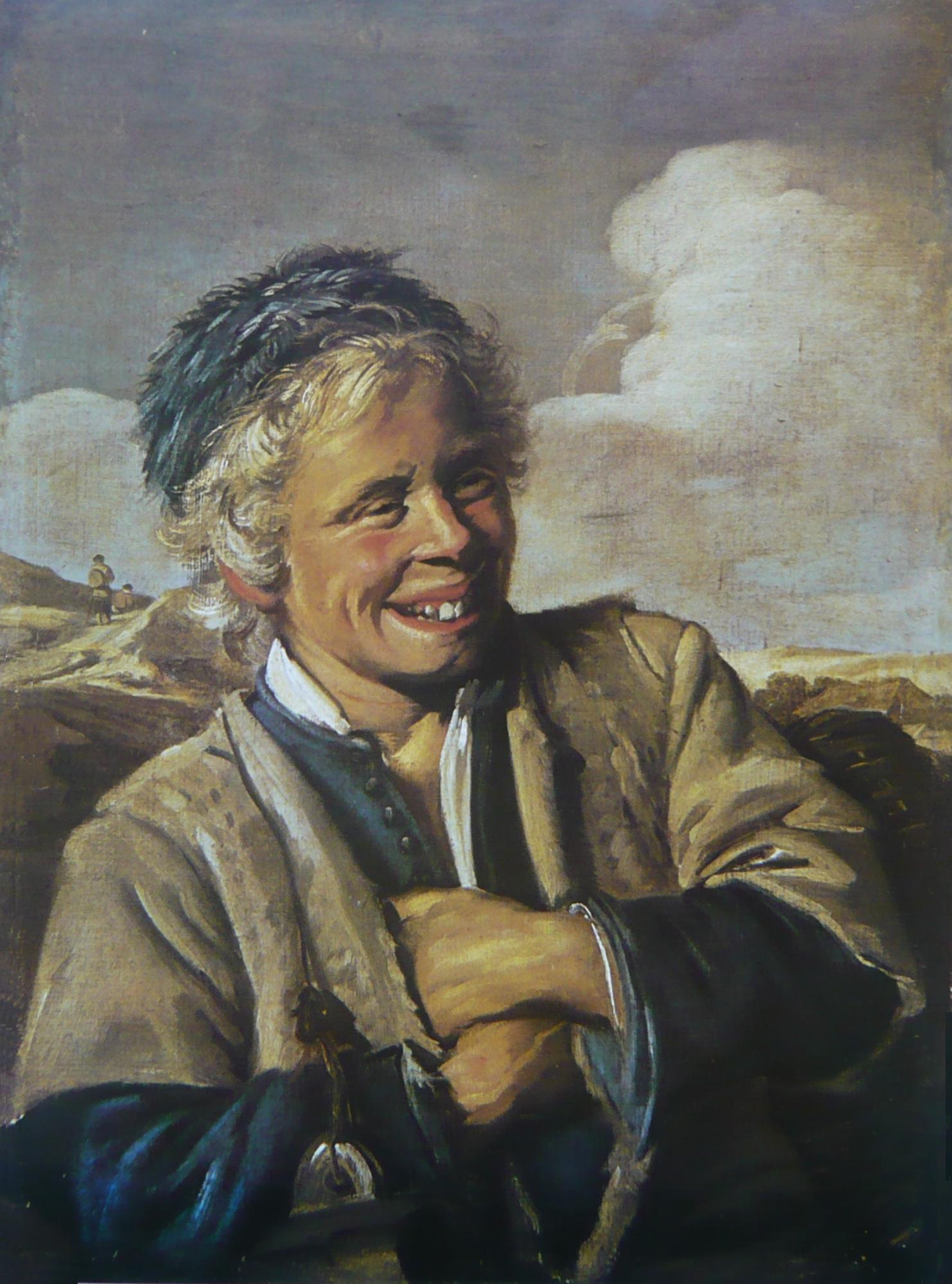
Laughing Fisherboy

== See also ==
- List of paintings by Frans Hals
