= Fisher Boy with Basket =

Painting by Frans Hals

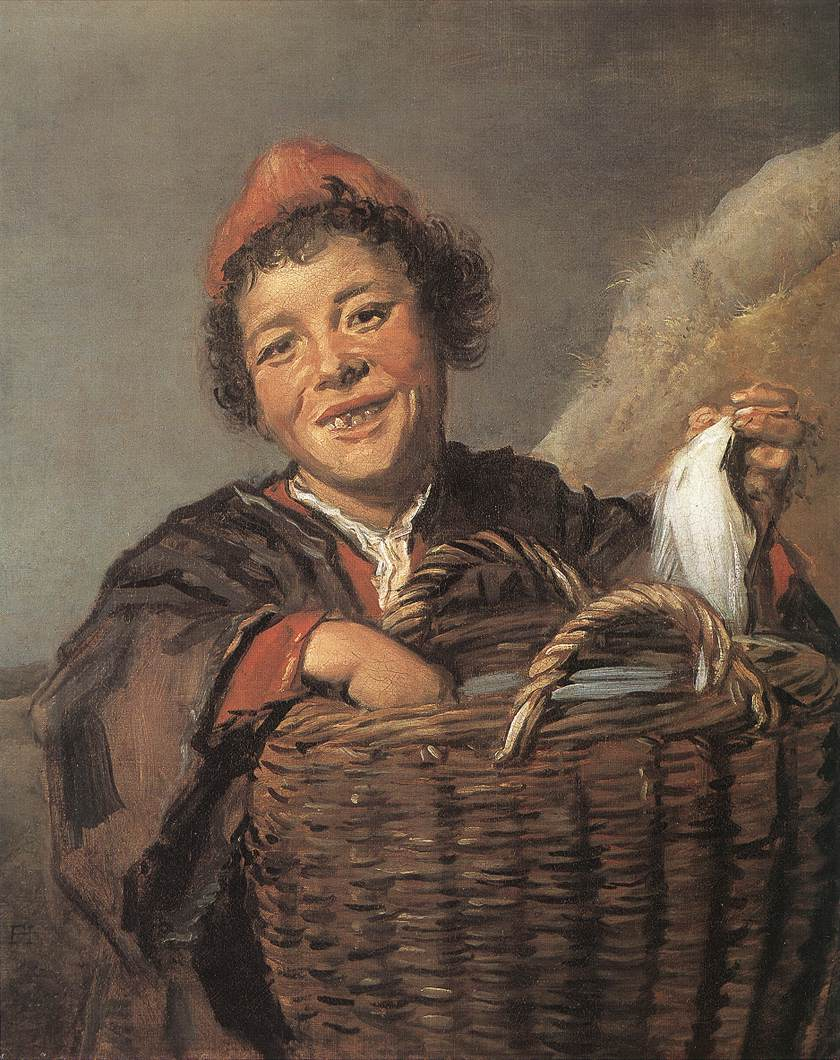
- Fisher boy with basket, c.1630, oil on canvas, 72 cm x 58 cm
- Artist: Frans Hals
- Year: c. 1630
- Catalogue: Seymour Slive, Catalog 1974: #73
- Medium: Oil on canvas
- Dimensions: 72 cm × 58 cm (28 in × 23 in)
- Location: National Gallery of Ireland; Dublin

Fisher boy with basket is an oil-on-canvas painting by the Dutch Golden Age painter Frans Hals, painted in the early 1630s, now in the National Gallery of Ireland.

== Painting ==
This painting was documented by Cornelis Hofstede de Groot in 1910, who wrote:

51. A FISHER-BOY. B. 68; M. 255. Half-length; almost in full face, with the head slightly bent to the left. He laughs at the spectator; his mouth is open, showing the teeth. He wears a dark coat with broad sleeves, and a small red cap. He lays his right wrist on a large basket. He holds up a fish in his left hand. Very characteristic. Signed with the monogram; canvas, 28 1/2 inches by 23 inches. Engraved by Paul le Rat. Sale. John W. Wilson of Brussels, Paris, March 14, 1881, 1873 catalogue, p. 85. In the National Gallery of Ireland, Dublin, 1898 catalogue, No. 193.

Hofstede de Groot noted several fisherboys by Hals along with this one (catalogue numbers 49 through to 58c). This painting was also documented by W.R. Valentiner in 1923.

Other fisher folk by Hals:

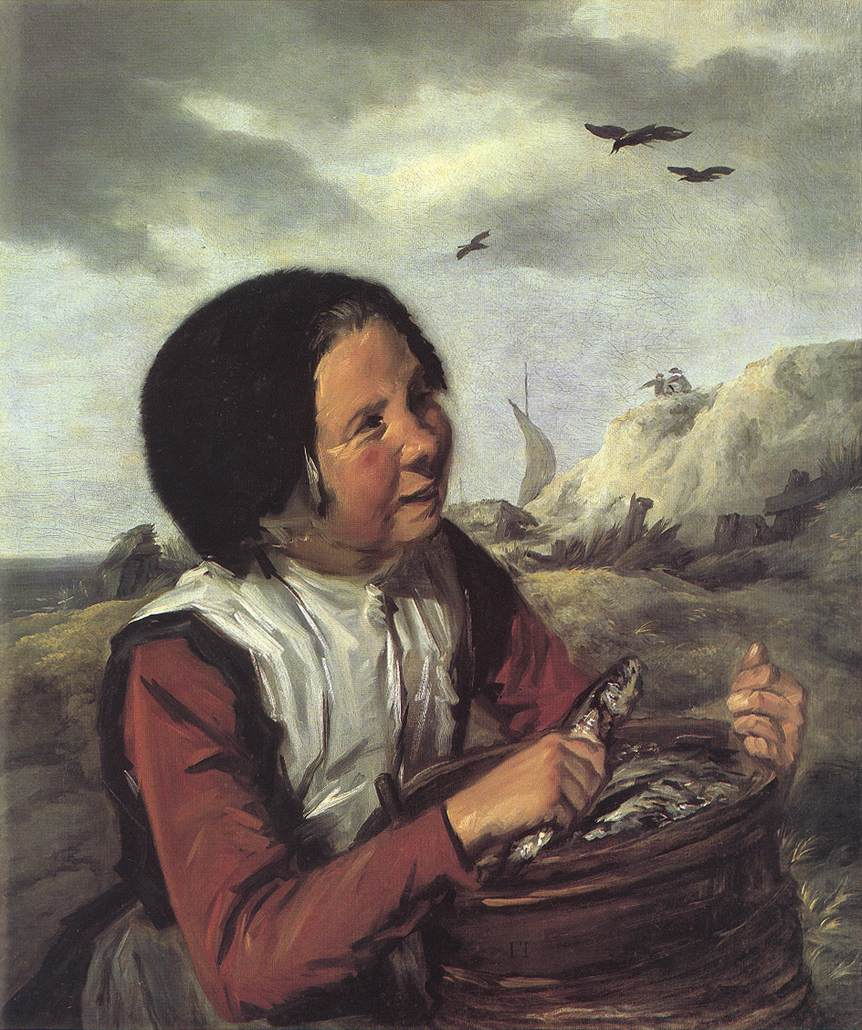
Smiling Fishergirl

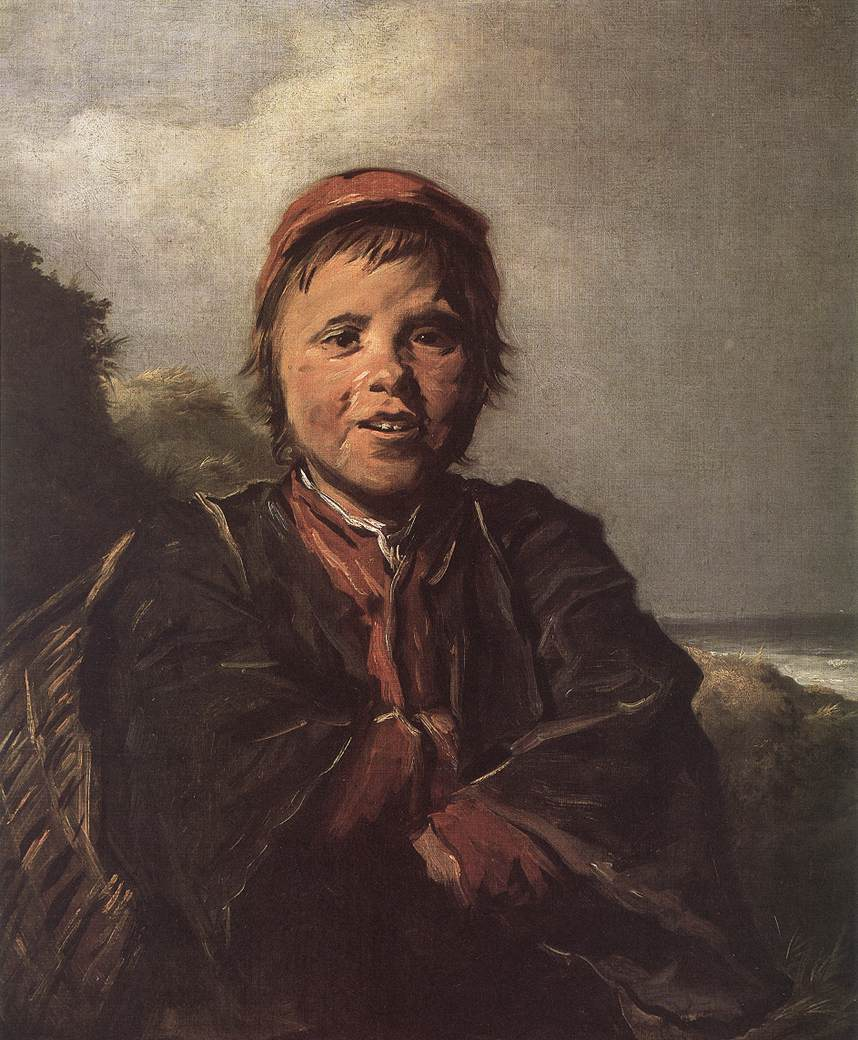
The Fisher Boy

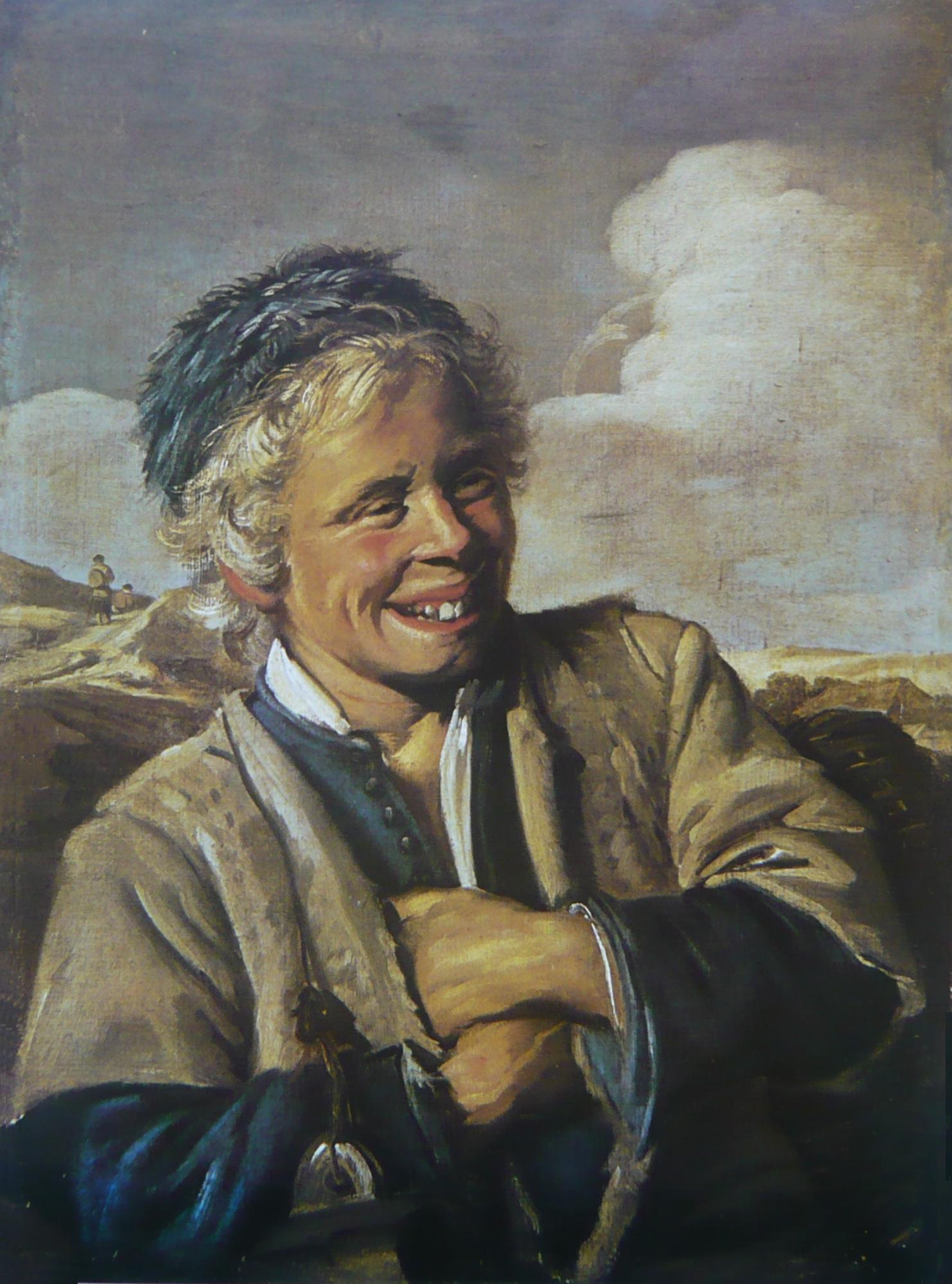
Laughing Fisherboy

== See also ==
- List of paintings by Frans Hals
