= The Fisher Boy =

Painting by Frans Hals

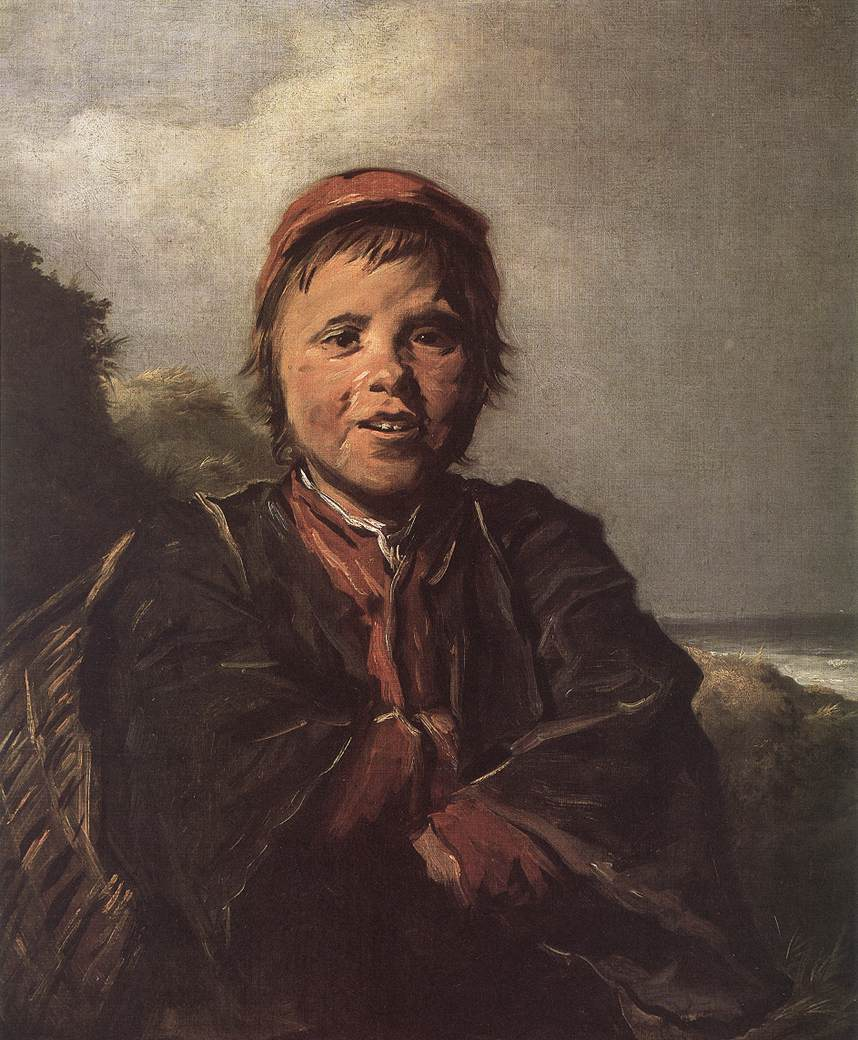
- The Fisher Boy, c.1630 Oil on canvas, 74 cm x 61 cm
- Artist: Frans Hals
- Year: c. 1630
- Catalogue: Seymour Slive, Catalog 1974: #71
- Medium: Oil on canvas
- Dimensions: 74 cm × 61 cm (29 in × 24 in)
- Location: Royal Museum of Fine Arts Antwerp; Antwerp

The Fisher Boy is a painting by the Dutch Golden Age painter Frans Hals, painted in the early 1630s, now in the Royal Museum of Fine Arts Antwerp.

== Painting ==
This painting was documented by Cornelis Hofstede de Groot in 1910, who wrote "49. DE STRANDLOOPER VAN HAARLEM (The Haarlem Fisher-Boy). B. 37; M. 254. Half-length; life size. A fisher-boy, seen in full face, laughs at the spectator. His arms are folded on his breast. He wears a little cap; his hair is in disorder. He wears a jacket with broad sleeves, and carries a basket on his back. At the back is a landscape; to the right is the sea. [Possibly identical with 55, 58a, and 58c.] Signed on the left with the intertwined letters " F. H."; canvas, 30 inches by 25 1/2 inches. Sale. Alphonse Oudry, Paris, April 16 and 20, 1869. In the possession of the Paris dealer Ch. Sedelmeyer, " Catalogue of 300 Paintings," 1898, No. 46. In the Antwerp Museum, 1905 catalogue, No. 188. "

Hofstede de Groot noted several fisherboys by Hals along with this one (catalogue numbers 49 through to 58c). This painting was also documented by W.R. Valentiner in 1923.

Other fisher folk by Hals:

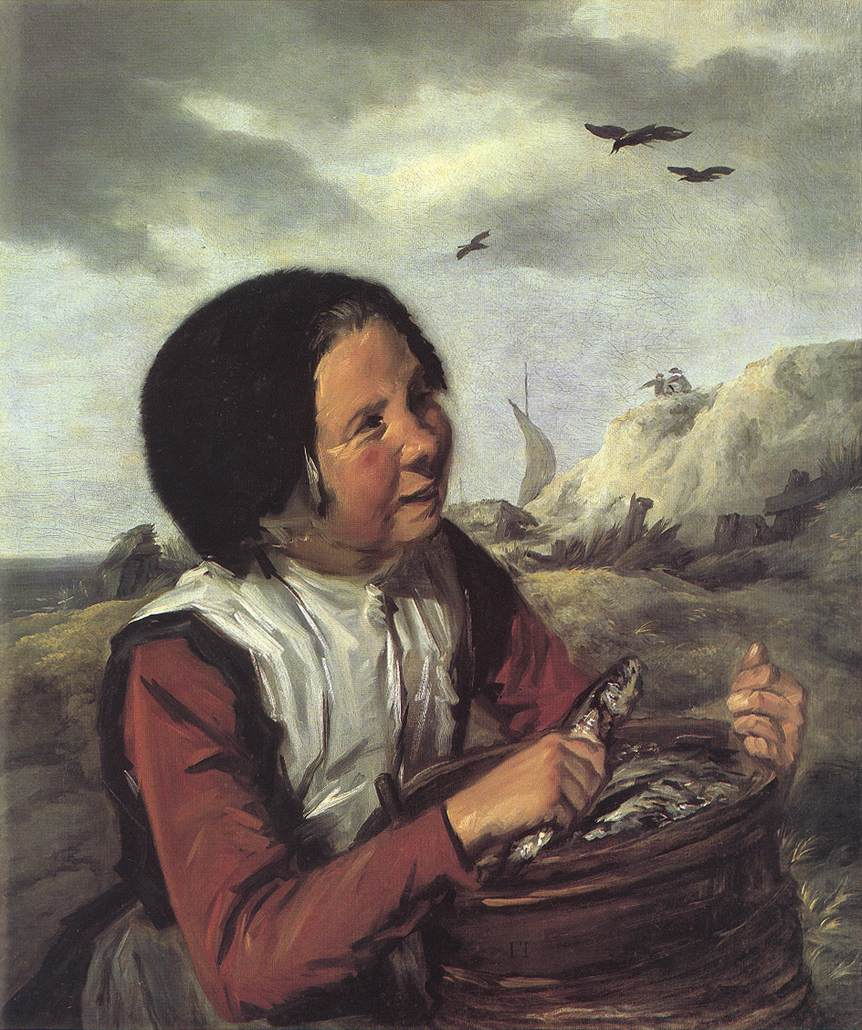
Smiling Fishergirl

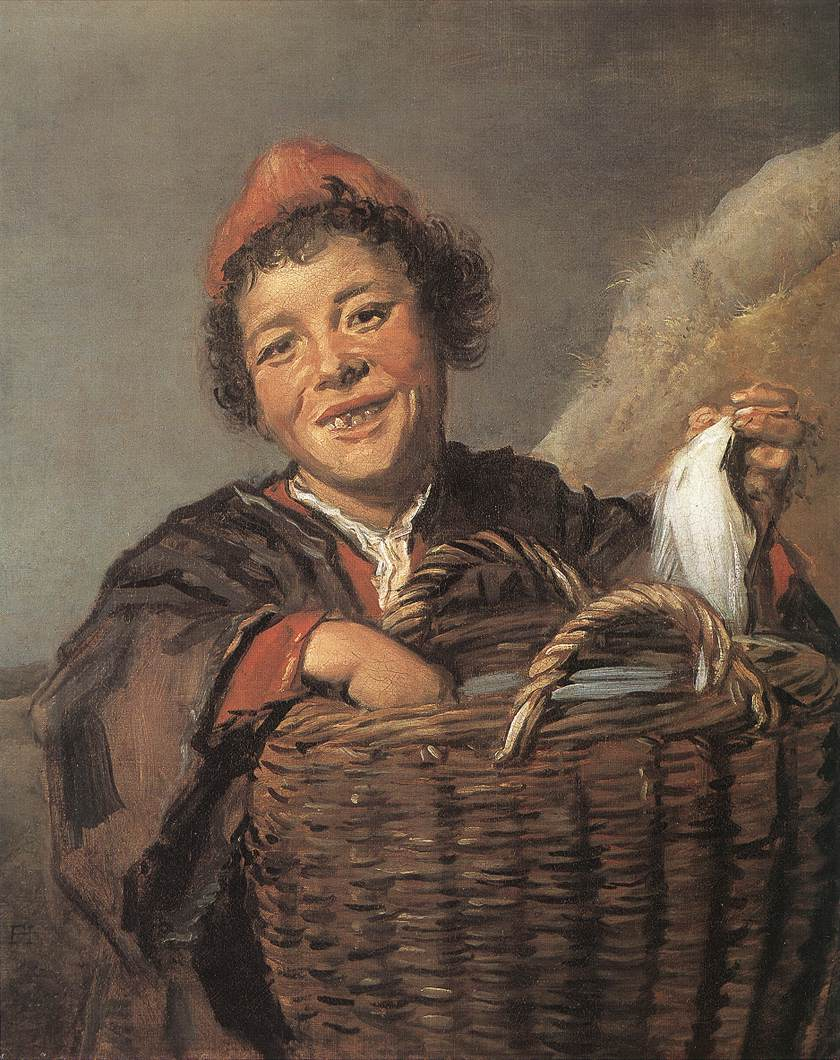
Fisher boy with basket

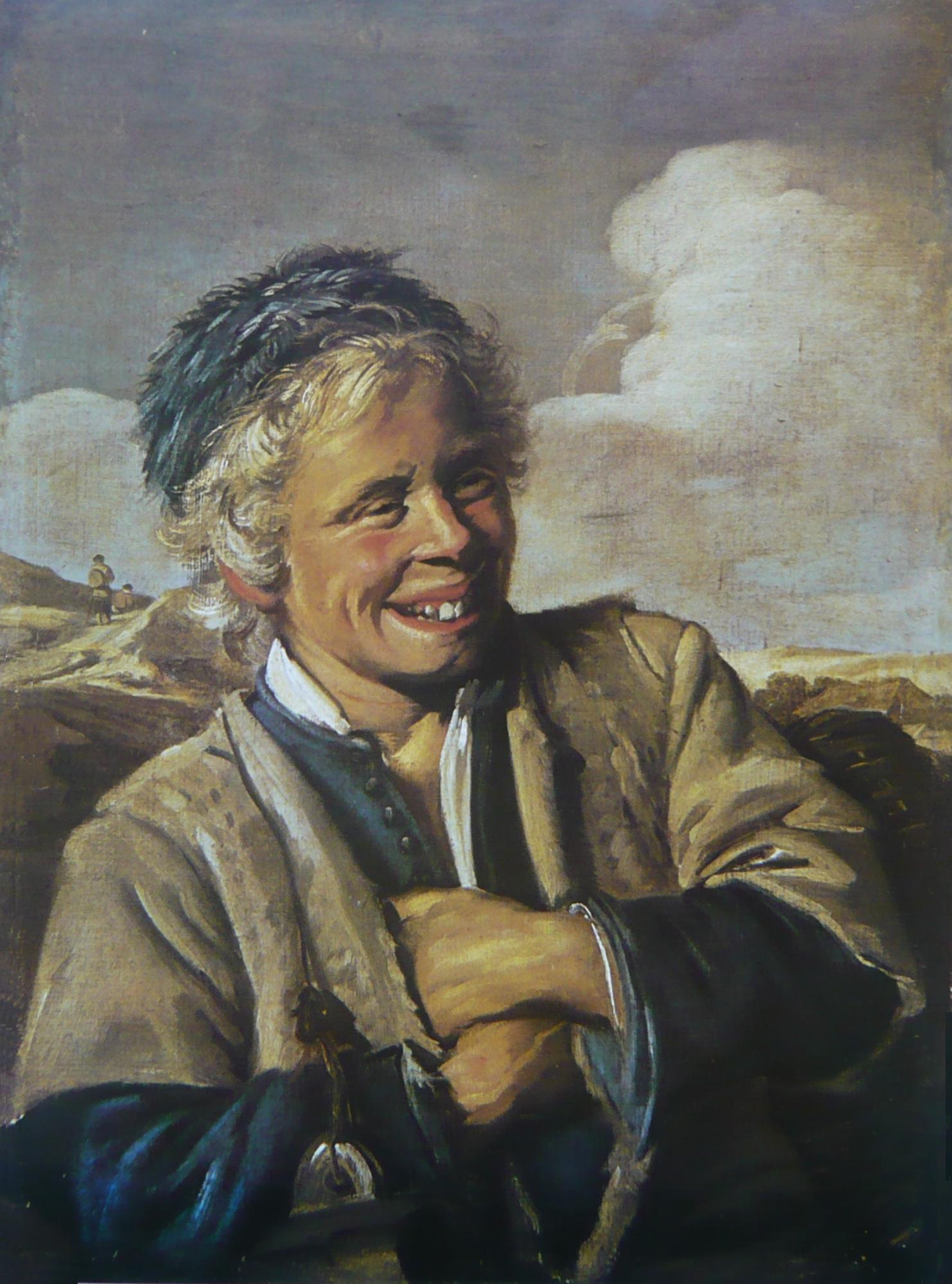
Laughing Fisherboy

== See also ==
- List of paintings by Frans Hals
