= Laughing Fisherboy =

Painting by Frans Hals

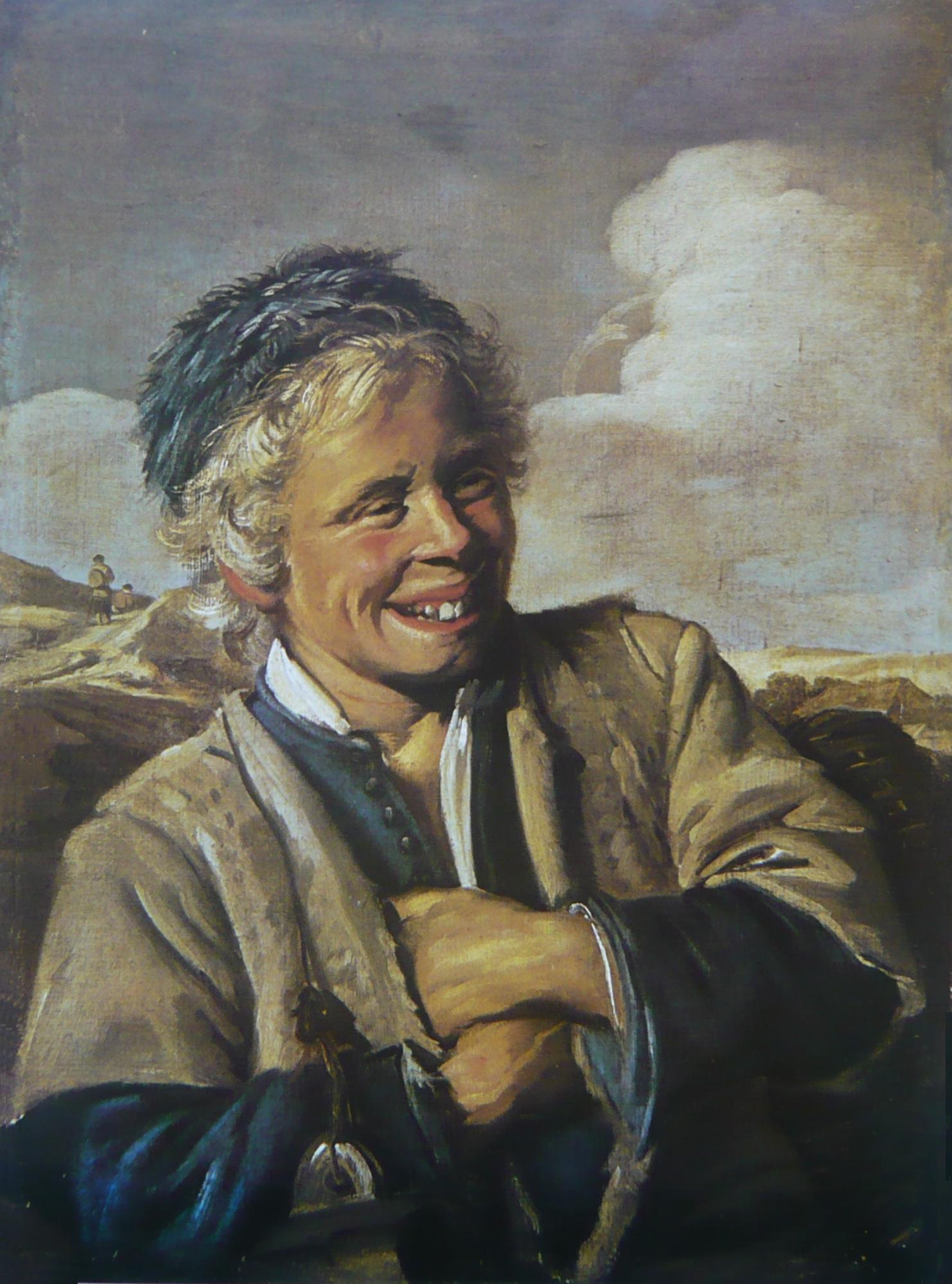
- Laughing Fisherboy, c.1628, oil on canvas, 82 cm × 60.2 cm (32.3 in × 23.7 in)
- Artist: Frans Hals
- Year: 1628
- Catalogue: Seymour Slive, Catalog 1974: #55
- Medium: Oil on canvas
- Dimensions: 82 cm × 60.2 cm (32 in × 23.7 in)
- Location: Prince zu Bentheim und Steinfurt; Burgsteinfurt

Laughing Fisherboy is an oil-on-canvas painting by the Dutch Golden Age painter Frans Hals, painted in 1628 and now in Westphalia.

== Painting ==
This painting was documented by Ernst Wilhelm Moes in 1909 and Cornelis Hofstede de Groot in 1910, who wrote:

A LAUGHING FISHER BOY. M. 253 - A fair boy, turned to the right. He holds his hands before his breast. He wears a blue cap, a blue doublet, and over it a grey jacket with short sleeves. Behind his left arm is seen the basket which he carries on his back. At the back is a view of the dunes. To the left are two little figures on a road. On the right a church spire rises a little above the dunes. Cloudy sky. Very broad and loose in style. The boy's smile is very well rendered. In good preservation. Signed, on a jug hanging from a strap over the shoulder, with a monogram composed of the letters "F H F"; canvas, 26 1/2 inches by 22 inches.

Hofstede de Groot noticed that this painting is similar to several other paintings by Hals, which Seymour Slive and Claus Grimm refer to as "fisher folk".

In the exhibition catalog for the 1962 show, this painting's entry at #21 states that N.S. Trivas went too far when he dismissed all of these paintings as being unattributable to the master, and that the shaggy cap is one which was often worn by farmers and Dutch sailors in the 17th century.

Other fisher folk by Hals:

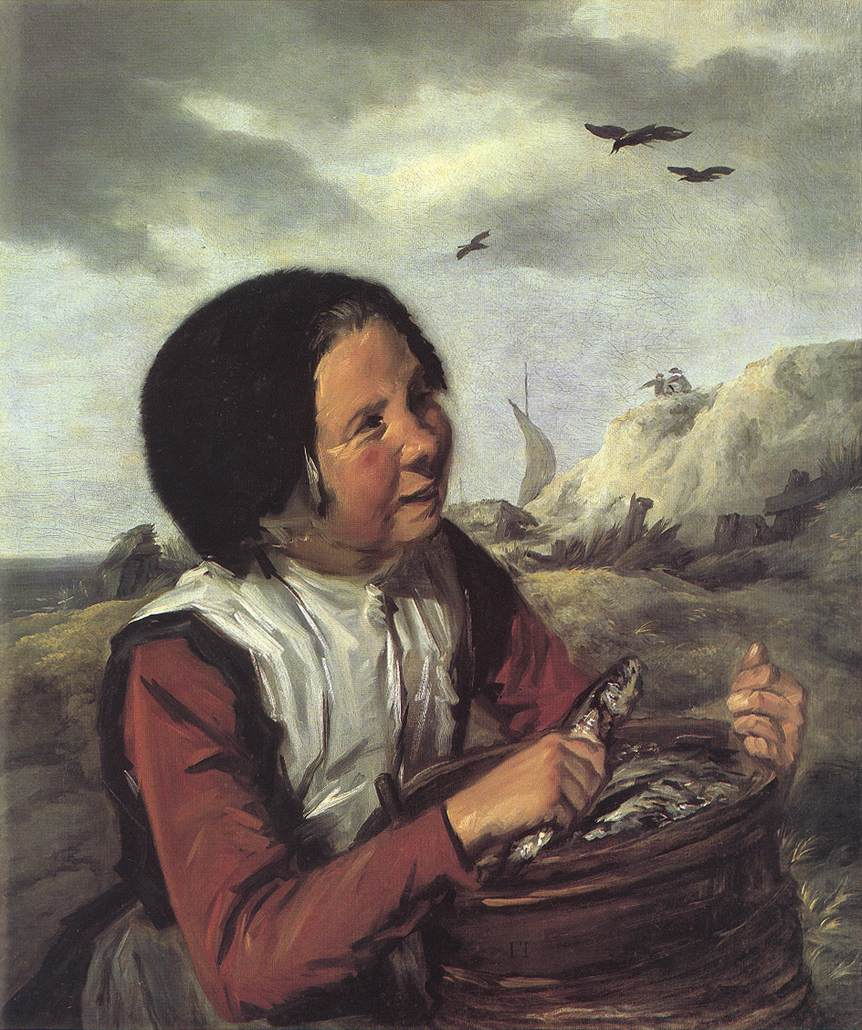
Smiling Fishergirl

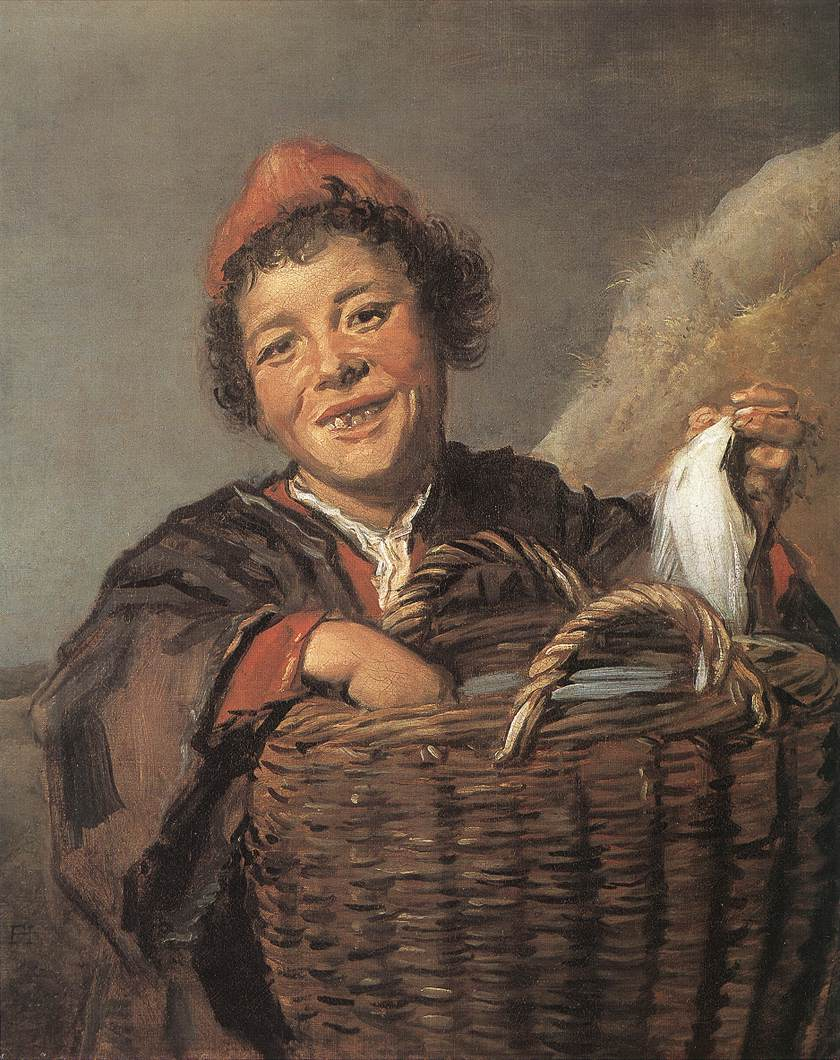
Fisher boy with basket

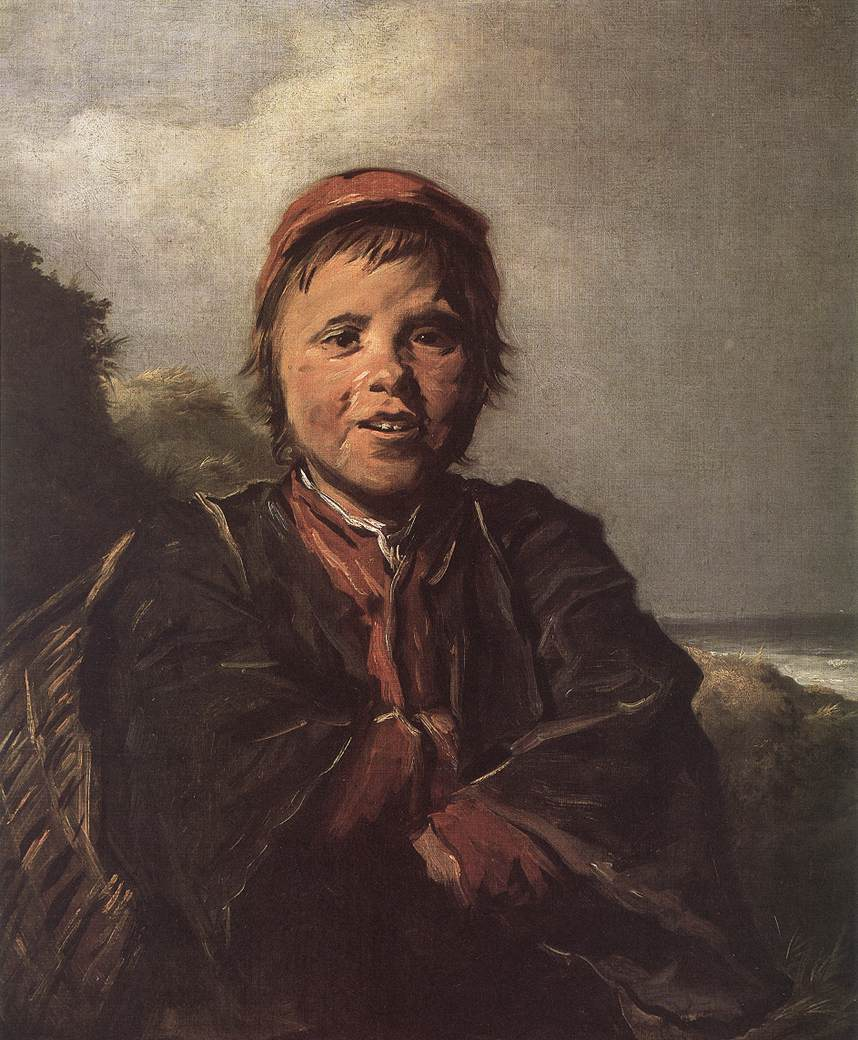
The Fisher Boy

== See also ==
- List of paintings by Frans Hals
